With the 1975 reforms the Italian Army abolished the regimental level and replaced it with brigades made up of multiple arms (including for example armour, infantry, and artillery). During the reform the army disbanded 48 regimental commands and reduced its force by 87 battalions. A further ten regimental commands were used to raise ten new brigade commands. Ten training centers, which for traditional reasons had carried the names of regiments, were also disbanded. The reduction in units also allowed to mechanize most of the remaining units in Northern Italy and Italy's defense strategy changed from a hold-at-all-costs territorial defense to one of mobile warfare.

The reform was pushed through by General Andrea Cucino. Having become Chief of the General Staff of the Army on 1 February 1975, Cucino, concerned with the number of undermanned and underequipped units, ordered an immediate review of the army's structure. After two months Cucino and his staff presented a plan to restructure the entire army, and having secured an additional 1,100 billion Lire over 10 years to modernize the army's equipment, Cucino ordered the reform to begin with 1 September 1975. By 31 November 1975 the reform concluded and the army's organs, units, doctrine, training, and organization had been thoroughly and radically altered. After the reform operational units were at 93% readiness, with the Armored Division "Ariete" and the Anti-aircraft Artillery Command at 100% readiness.

Third Army 
As a founding member of NATO Italy was obliged to assign its military forces to NATO's integrated military command in case of war. While the Italian Air Force's operational units would have come under NATO's Fifth Allied Tactical Air Force (5 ATAF) in Vicenza, the Italian Army would have come under NATO's Allied Land Forces Southern Europe (LANDSOUTH) in Verona. However, as tensions between Italy and Yugoslavia over the Free Territory of Trieste were high after World War II and as Yugoslavia was not a Warsaw Pact member a conflict between the two countries would have likely not involved NATO. Therefore, on 1 May 1952 the Italian Army re-activated the Third Army in Padua to be able to act outside NATO's chain of command in case a war would break out between Italy and Yugoslavia. Third Army duplicated the functions of LANDSOUTH with a purely Italian staff. To not violate NATO's integrated military command Italy described Third Army in all official documents as "the command designated Third Army" (il Comando Designato 3a Armata) and assigned no combat units to it during peacetime.

In case of war Third Army would have commanded the V Army Corps in Vittorio Veneto and the Carnia-Cadore Troops Command of the IV Alpine Army Corps. The latter command, based in San Daniele del Friuli, had been specifically created to be able to split the IV Alpine Army Corps' area of operation in case of war with Yugoslavia. Reinforcements for Third Army would have come from the III Army Corps in Milan and the VI Army Corps in Bologna.

With the easing of tensions between Italy and Yugoslavia, which culminated in the division of the Free Territory of Trieste with the Treaty of Osimo in 1975, the army disbanded Third Army, along with the VI Army Corps, on 1 April 1972. With the 1975 reform the last traces of Third Army's existence were eliminated: the Carnia-Cadore Troops Command was disbanded and the support units that had supported the Command Designated Third Army were reassigned or disbanded. Furthermore, the army significantly reduced its forces in the Friuli-Venezia Giulia region along the Yugoslavian-Italian border: 17 regimental commands and 28 battalions were disbanded and a further six regimental commands were transformed into brigade commands. In total about a third of the pre-reform personnel were withdrawn from the Friuli-Venezia Giulia region as a goodwill gesture to Yugoslavia.

Personnel and training 
As part of the reform the military service length for the army was reduced from 15 to 12 months (Article 40, Law nr. 191, 31 May 1975). Subsequently, the army reduced its personnel strength from 285,000 to 240,000. At the same time the training of recruits was radically altered: until 1975 all recruits received their basic training at ten Recruits Training Centers (Centro Addestramento Reclute - CAR) and where assigned only afterwards to their units. With the reform all higher commands were assigned Recruits Training Battalions (Battaglione Addestramento Reclute - BAR), which trained the recruits assigned to the command's units.

Another part of the reform focused on the selection of the army's squad leaders. Until the reform squad leaders were chosen prior to their arrival at the army's Recruits Training Centers based on their army physical and their prior civilian education. Their actually ability to lead a squad was not taken into account and therefore General Cucino ended this practice. Forthwith the company commanders of the Recruits Training Battalions chose future squad leaders among their best recruits.

Naming conventions

Numerals 
Until the 1975 reform the army alternated the numbering of its units between Roman numerals and Arabic numerals. With the reform the use of Roman numerals was discontinued. The table below gives an overview of the units of the army and the use of numerals before 1975:

Brigades 
With the reform the army raised ten new brigades and named them, depending on the division they were assigned to, by different conventions:

 The Armored Division "Centauro" was split into two brigades, which both were named for battles fought in Lombardy during the First Italian War of Independence:
 3rd Mechanized Brigade "Goito", named for the Battle of Goito
 31st Armored Brigade "Curtatone", named for the Battle of Curtatone
 The two brigades were joined by the Mechanized Brigade "Legnano", which was named for the World War II 58th Infantry Division "Legnano", which in turn had been named for the medieval Battle of Legnano fought between the Lombard League and Holy Roman Emperor Frederick Barbarossa.

 The Armored Division "Ariete" was split into three brigades, which were named for heroes of the Revolutions of 1848 in the Italian states:
 8th Mechanized Brigade "Garibaldi" named to honor Giuseppe Garibaldi, who led the military forces of the Republic of Rome
 32nd Armored Brigade "Mameli" named to honor Goffredo Mameli, who wrote the national anthem of Italy and died during the Siege of Rome
 132nd Armored Brigade "Manin" named to honor Daniele Manin, who was the president of the Republic of San Marco
 The Mechanized Division "Folgore" consisted of three brigades after the reform: two named for World War I battles, and a pre-existing brigade, named for a World War II division, which had distinguished itself during the Western Desert campaign:
 Mechanized Brigade "Gorizia", named for the Battle of Gorizia
 Armored Brigade "Vittorio Veneto", named for the Battle of Vittorio Veneto
 The two brigades were joined by the Mechanized Brigade "Trieste", which was named for the World War II 101st Motorised Division "Trieste".

 The Mechanized Division "Mantova" consisted of three brigades after the reform: a new one named for a World War I battle, a pre-existing brigade named for a World War I battle, and a new brigade, named after a World War II division, which had distinguished itself during the Western Desert campaign:
 Mechanized Brigade "Isonzo", named after the World War II 14th Infantry Division "Isonzo", which in turn had been named for the Battles of the Isonzo
 Mechanized Brigade "Brescia", named after the World War II 27th Infantry Division "Brescia"
 The two brigades were joined by the Armored Brigade "Pozzuolo del Friuli", named for the World War I Battle of Pozzuolo.

The tenth new brigade was the Motorized Brigade "Acqui", named after the World War II 33rd Infantry Division "Acqui".

Battalions and groups 

In 1975 newly independent battalions and groups were given a name, battle flag, and coat of arms. These names, flags, and coats of arms are still in use today. The naming convention introduced in 1975 is as follows:

Infantry 
Each speciality of the infantry developed its own naming convention.

The three Granatieri (Grenadier) battalions were named for two battles, where the Granatieri had withstood overwhelming enemy numbers, and for the oldest regiment of their line:
 1st Mechanized Granatieri Battalion "Assietta", named for the War of the Austrian Succession Battle of Assietta, where in 1747 the Granatieri stopped the French invasion of Piedmont
 2nd Mechanized Granatieri Battalion "Cengio", named for the World War I battle of Monte Cengio, where in 1916 the Granatieri stopped the Austro-Hungarian Asiago offensive
 3rd Granatieri (Recruits Training) Battalion "Guardie" (BAR), named for the Guards Regiment (Reggimento delle Guardie) raised in 1659

Line infantry regiments already carried names before the reform and mostly retained them. The newly independent line infantry battalions, which changed their names, did so because:
 in one case a division with same name existed (114th Infantry Regiment "Mantova" - Mechanized Division "Mantova")
 in six cases the regiment was part of a brigade with the same name (i.e. 17th Infantry Regiment "Acqui" - Motorized Brigade "Acqui", 67th Infantry Regiment "Legnano" - Mechanized Brigade "Legnano")
 in six cases because the regiment's sister regiment was also active with the same name (i.e. 59th Infantry Regiment "Calabria" - 60th Infantry Regiment "Calabria", 151st Infantry Regiment "Sassari"- 152nd Infantry Regiment "Sassari")
 in two cases because an artillery regiment carried the same name (33rd Infantry Regiment "Livorno" - 28th Artillery Regiment "Livorno", 120th Infantry Regiment "Emilia" - 155th Artillery Regiment "Emilia")
 in two cases because a brigade with the same name existed and because the regiment's sister regiment was already active with the same name: 21st Infantry Regiment "Cremona" - 22nd Infantry Regiment "Cremona" - Motorized Brigade"Cremona".
 in the case of the reactivated 1st Infantry Regiment "Re" ("King"), because the army did not want the unit to carry a royal title. For the same reason the 9th Infantry Regiment "Regina" ("Queen") had been renamed 9th Infantry Regiment "Bari" in 1947.

All newly independent infantry battalions, with the exception of six, were named for battles where the antecedent regiment had distinguished itself. The six battalions were renamed, in one case for the patron saint of the city where the unit was based (1st Motorized Infantry Battalion "San Giusto"), in one case for a quarter of the city, which was the unit's former title (33rd Infantry Fortification Battalion "Ardenza"), in one case for a historic event that had occurred in the area of the regiment's former title (74th Infantry Fortification Battalion "Pontida"). In the remaining three cases for the historic name of the region surrounding the unit's base from where it drew its recruits: 45th Infantry (Training) Battalion "Arborea", 47th Infantry (Training) Battalion "Salento", 91st Infantry (Training) Battalion "Lucania".

Bersaglieri regiments and battalions had not carried names before the reform and the newly independent battalions were named, with two exceptions, for battles. The 1st Bersaglieri Battalion was named for the founder of the Bersaglieri corps General Alessandro Ferrero La Marmora, while the 11th Battalion, which had received the flag of the 182nd Regiment "Garibaldi", was named for the island of Caprera, where Giuseppe Garibaldi had spent the last years of his life.

Alpini battalions and the associated mountain artillery groups had been recruited in the Alpine valleys of Northern Italy and were named since 1887 for the location of their main depot. With the 1975 reform Alpini battalions and mountain artillery groups became independent under their historic names.

Armor battalions were named for officers, soldiers and partisans, who were posthumously awarded Italy's highest military honor the Gold Medal of Military Valour for heroism during World War II. Similarly the two mechanized Carabinieri battalions were named for Carabinieri officers, who were posthumously awarded the Gold Medal of Military Valour. I.e. 13th Tank Battalion "M.O. Pascucci".

Paracadutisti (Paratroopers) battalions were named for World War II battles: Second Battle of El Alamein, Air Assault of Poggio Rusco, and one battalion was named for the location of the first Italian military parachute school Tarquinia. The Paratroopers Assault Battalion was named for the World War I conquest of the summit of Col Moschin by its predecessor regiment.

The infantry's youngest speciality the Lagunari fielded two battalions after the reform:
 1st Lagunari Battalion "Serenissima", named for the honorary title of the Republic of Venice
 Amphibious Vehicles Battalion "Sile", named for the Sile river, which flows into the Venetian lagoon and was the location of heavy combat between Austro-Hungarian and Italian forces in 1918.

Cavalry 
During the reform two cavalry squadron groups were reactivated and both, as all already active squadron groups, retained their traditional names. Two squadron groups retained their names based on former Kingdom of Sardinia possession in France: "Nizza Cavalleria" named for the County of Nice and "Savoia Cavalleria" named for the Duchy of Savoy. One squadrons group retained its name based on the Second Italian War of Independence Battle of Montebello, one squadrons group retained its title as the guides ("Guide") of the army, while the remainder of the squadron groups retained their names, which were derived from Italian regions (i.e. "Piemonte Cavalleria") or cities (i.e. "Lancieri di Novara").

Artillery 
The artillery remained divided into the following specialities:
 da campagna - Field Artillery (includes also da campagna semovente (self-propelled field artillery) and da campagna paracadutisti (paratroopers field artillery)): groups of this type were maneuver elements of brigade-level units and were given flags and names of former divisional artillery regiments.
 pesante campale - Heavy Field Artillery (includes also pesante campale semovente (heavy self-propelled field artillery)): regiments and groups of this type were support elements of divisions or corps; the first were given flags of former divisional artillery regiments, while the latter received flags of former army corps artillery regiments.
 pesante - Heavy Artillery (includes also pesante semovente (heavy self-propelled artillery)): groups of this type were tasked with army-level strategic nuclear fire and were given, with the exception of the 27th Heavy Self-propelled Artillery Regiment, flags of former army artillery regiments. The 27th Artillery Regiment was originally a field artillery regiment, which had become a Heavy Artillery unit over time, which still retained its Field Artillery flag.
 da montagna - Mountain Artillery: groups of this type were maneuver elements of Alpine brigades.
 controaerei - Anti-aircraft Artillery.
 a cavallo - Horse Artillery: the only regiment of this type was organized as a Heavy Field Artillery regiment.

Most artillery units retained the names of the former regiments, whose flags they were given. The units, which changed their names, did so because:
 in two because cases a division with same name existed (131st Artillery Regiment "Centauro" - Armored Division "Centauro", 132nd Artillery Regiment "Ariete" - Armored Division "Ariete")
 in one cases a division and a brigade with same name existed (185th Paratroopers Artillery Regiment "Folgore" - Mechanized Division "Folgore" - Paratroopers Brigade "Folgore")
 in five cases a brigade with the same name existed (i.e. 7th Artillery Regiment "Cremona" - Motorized Brigade "Cremona", 35th Artillery Regiment "Friuli" - Motorized Brigade "Friuli").
 in eight cases because an infantry regiment carried the same name (183rd Infantry Regiment "Nembo" - 184th Artillery Regiment "Nembo")
 and in the case of the 120th Self-propelled Field Artillery Group "Po" name had to be chosen as the preceding unit was simply known as 120th Motorized Regiment.

Unlike the other service arms of the army the artillery did not follow a unified naming convention. Which led to units being named for battles (3rd "Pastrengo", 13th "Magliana", 184th "Filottrano"), rivers (1st "Adige", 10th "Avisio"), mountains (i.e. 4th "Bondone"), landscapes (i.e. 14th "Murge", 47th "Gargano"), cities (i.e. 33rd "Terni", 132nd "Rovereto"), bridges (19th "Rialto"), and World War II divisions (120th "Po"). However light anti-aircraft reserve groups were named systematically for birds of prey.

Engineers 
Engineer battalions were named for a lake if they supported a corps or named for a river if they supported a division or brigade: i.e. the 5th Pioneers Battalion "Bolsena" supported the 5th Army Corps, while the 104th Pioneers Battalion "Torre" supported the Mechanized Division "Mantova". In the case of the 184th Pioneers Battalion "Santerno" the name was chosen to also commemorate the CLXXXIV Engineer Battalion's role in crossing the river Santerno during the allied 1945 Spring offensive.

Signals 
Signal battalions were named for mountain passes, with the exception of the two Southernmost units, which were named for volcanoes. I.e. named for passes: 4th Signal Battalion "Gardena", 33rd Electronic Warfare Battalion "Falzarego"; named for volcanoes: 45th Signal Battalion "Vulture" and 46th Signal Battalion "Mongibello".

Army aviation 
Army aviation units were new creations and named for celestial objects:
 Groupings were numbered with a single digit and named for stars: i.e. the 5th Army Light Aviation Grouping "Rigel" was named for the brightest star in the Orion constellation. Accordingly, the coat of arms of aviation units highlight the name-giving star within its constellation. Aviation support units elevated to regiment in the 1990s were named for the constellation of the aviation regiment they supported: i.e. the support regiment of the 5th Army Aviation Regiment "Rigel" was named 2nd Army Aviation Support Regiment "Orione".
 Squadron groups were numbered with two digits and named for constellations, and planets of the Solar System. When possible the names were chosen to relate to a unit's location or its superior unit: i.e. the 34th Squadrons Group formed in 1986 from squadrons based in Turin was named "Toro" (Italian for bull) as the symbol of Turin is a rampant bull. The 46th Squadrons Group of the "Centauro" division was named "Sagittario", as this constellation is commonly represented by a centaur pulling-back a bow, which is also the division's symbol. Furthermore, the numbers assigned to squadron groups were specified as:
 10-19 for medium transport helicopters squadron groups (Elicotteri da Trasporto Medio - ETM)
 20-39 for light airplanes and helicopters squadron groups (Aerei Leggeri e Elicotteri - ALE)
 40-49 for reconnaissance helicopters squadron groups (Elicotteri da Ricognizione - ERI)
 50-59 for multirole helicopters squadron groups (Elicotteri Multiruolo - EM)
If a squadrons group was part of a regiment the second digit of its number corresponded to the number of the regiment. I.e. the 44th Squadrons Group was a reconnaissance helicopter unit assigned to the 4th Army Aviation Regiment "Altair".

Transport and materiel 
Transport groups were named for Roman roads near their bases: i.e. 10th Inter-forces Maneuver Transport Group "Salaria" and the 11th Maneuver Transport Group "Flaminia", both based in Rome, were named for Roman roads starting in Rome.

Logistic battalions were named for the division or brigade they were assigned to. In 1986 logistic units supporting the army corps were given the names of landscapes in the corps' area of operations (i.e. "Carnia", "Carso", "Dolomiti").

History 
This naming convention is still in force and newly created units' names adhere to it. I.e:
 1 October 1983: 51st Pioneer Battalion "Simeto" in Palermo, named for the Simeto river in Southern Sicily.
 13 July 1987: 10th Transport Battalion "Appia" in Naples, named for the Roman road Via Appia.
 5 July 1996: 7th Attack Helicopters Regiment "Vega" in Casarsa della Delizia, named for Vega - the brightest star in the Lyra constellation.
 24 January 2005: Battalion "Nemi" of the 6th Pioneer Regiment in Rome, named for lake Nemi in Lazio.

Flags and coat of arms 

For the first time the Italian Army allowed units below the regimental level to carry a flag ("bandiera di guerra"). With the presidential decrees n. 846 of 12 November 1976 and n. 173 of 14 March 1977 the newly raised units were officially assigned their names and either assigned an existing flag or granted a newly created one:
 Granatieri, Bersaglieri, cavalry, line infantry, field artillery, heavy artillery, anti-air artillery, engineer, and Paracadutisti battalions and groups were assigned flags of regiments disbanded during the reform or flags of non-active regiments, whose flags had been stored at Shrine of the Flags (Sacrario delle Bandiere) in the Vittoriano in Rome.
 Alpini, Lagunari, signal, mountain artillery, tank, and armored battalions and groups exceeded the number of pre-existing regiments and therefore were assigned a mix of existing flags and newly created flags.
 Aviation, logistic, Carabinieri and transport units were given flags for the first time and their flags were all of new creation.

In total 92 stored and 80 newly created flags were given to the units raised during the reform. With the flags these units also acquired the right to display a coat of arms. This required the army's heraldry office to design 80 new coat of arms and update the other 92, many of which had not been modified since the time of fascism and furthermore did not take the unit's World War II service into account. Therefore, the army's heraldry office created or updated the coat of arms for all existing units of the army. See Heraldry of the Italian Army for further details.

Equipment 
The reduction of forces allowed the army to retire old equipment and invest in new gear. The first priority was to improve the anti-tank capabilities of infantry units by speeding up the introduction of the BGM-71 TOW anti-tank guided missiles and ordering another 10,000 missiles, bringing the total number of launchers and missiles in service by 1978 to 432 launchers and more than 15,000 missiles. While the army had already bought 200 Leopard 1A2 main battle tanks and 69 Bergepanzer 2 armored recovery vehicles from Germany in 1971 and 1972 to equip the Cavalry Brigade "Pozzuolo del Friuli", in 1974 the army ordered an additional 400 license-built Leopard 1A2 and 67 Bergepanzer 2 from OTO-Melara to replace M47 Patton tanks and M74 armored recovery vehicles in units stationed in Northern Italy. In total the army reduced the number of M47 tanks in service by about 900. Unhappy with the protection level of the standard M113 armored personnel carrier the army ordered the same year 600 VCC-1 Camillino with improved armor and a M2 Browning machine gun for its armored and mechanized brigades. As the amphibious LVT-4 of the Lagunari Regiment were obsolete the army ordered 17 LVTP-7 as replacement (15x LVTP-7, 1x LVTP-7C command post, 1x LVTP-7R recovery vehicle). For the artillery 164 FH70 towed howitzers were ordered, while the last M7 Priest, M55 and M14/61 howitzers were retired. In total the army reduced the number of howitzers in service by about 450. The artillery's MGR-1 Honest John surface-to-surface missiles were replaced with MGM-52 Lance missiles, while its MQM-57 "Falconer" drones were replaced by Canadair CL-89B "Midge" drones. The Army's Light Aviation had received its first CH-47C Chinook transport helicopter in February 1973; by 1975 the first operational unit could be formed and all 24 Chinook were in service by October 1977. In the same year the first of 80 SM.1019A artillery observation and liaison plane entered service and began to replace the L-18C Super Cub and L-21B Super Cub planes, which were finally taken out of service in 1979 and 1980 respectively. In 1976 the army acquired five A109 Hirundo helicopters: three in VIP transport configuration and two equipped with a telescopic sight unit and BGM-71 TOW anti-tank guided missiles to aid in the development of an indigenous attack helicopter.

Symbols 
 -> = "changed to"
 --> = "assigned to"
 ʘ-> = "moved to"

Army General Staff 

  Army General Staff (Stato Maggiore dell'Esercito (SME)), in Rome
 Chief of the Army General Staff
 Deputy Chief of the Army General Staff
 I Department (Operations, Training and Regulations, Studies)
 II Department (Organization, Services, Transport, Research and Studies)
 Operative Informations and Situation Service (SIOS)
 Personnel Secretariat
 Administration
  Medical Service, in Rome
 Military Medicine School, in Florence
 Training and Studies Office
 Complement Officer Cadets / Specialized Cadets Unit
 Administrative Service
 Special Infirmary
 Military Medicine Studies and Research Center, in Rome
  Military Veterinary Service, in Rome
 Military Veterinary Service School, in Pinerolo
 Military Veterinary Service Studies Center, in Rome
 Quadrupeds Infirmary, in Pinerolo
 Quadrupeds Infirmary, in Meran
 Quadrupeds Infirmary, in Udine
 Quadrupeds Rearing Post, in Grosseto
  Automotive Service, in Rome
 Secretariat and Personnel Office -> Office of the Chief (Secretariat and Personnel, Studies and Regulations, Training and Organization)
 Regulation, Organization and Training Office -> disbanded
 Motorization Schools Command, in Rome-Cecchignola
 Command Unit, in Rome-Cecchignola
 Automotive Service Application School, in Rome-Cecchignola ->  Automotive Service Application School
 Motorization Specialists School, in Rome-Cecchignola ->  Motorization Specialists School
 Motorization Mechanics and Drivers School, in Rome-Cecchignola ->  Motorization Mechanics School
 Maneuver Transport Group, in Rome-Cecchignola
 Medium Workshop, in Rome-Cecchignola
 X Transport Group, in Rome ->  10th Interforces Maneuver Transport Group "Via Salaria" (granted a new flag)
 XI Maneuver Transport Group, in Rome ->  11th Maneuver Transport Group "Flaminia" (granted a new flag)
  Military Commissariat Service, in Rome
  Military Commissariat and Administration Services School, in Maddaloni
 Command Company, in Maddaloni -> Command and Services Company
 I Courses Unit (Commissariat), in Maddaloni -> 1st Specialized Cadets Battalion
 II Courses Unit (Administration), in Maddaloni > disbanded
 III Experimental Unit, in Maddaloni -> 3rd Experimental Battalion
 IV Specialized Cadets Unit, in Nocera Inferiore -> 2nd Specialized Cadets Battalion
  Military Administration Service, in Rome
 Artillery Technical Service, in Rome
 Engineering Technical Service, in Rome
 Signal Technical Service, in Rome
 Motorization Technical Service, in Rome
 Chemical-Physical Technical Service, in Rome
 Geographic Technical Service, in Rome
 Military Geographical Institute, in Florence
  War School, in Civitavecchia
  Military Academy, in Modena
 Arms Application Schools Command, in Turin ->  Application School
  Infantry and Cavalry Application School, in Turin -> disbanded
  Artillery Application School, in Turin -> disbanded
  Engineering Application School, in Turin -> disbanded
  "Nunziatella" Military School, in Naples
  Non-commissioned Officers Cadets School, in Viterbo
 Army Foreign Languages School, in Rome

Infantry and Cavalry Inspectorate 
 Infantry and Cavalry Inspectorate, in Rome
 Secretariat and Personnel Office -> 1st Office: Secretariat, Organization, and Personnel
 Training, Regulations, Schools Office -> 2nd Office: Schools Training and Regulations; Schools Courses and Materials
 Studies and Experiences Office -> disbanded
 General Officer Divisional Infantry -> General Officer for motorized, alpine, parachute, and fortification infantry units
  Infantry School, in Cesano
 Command Unit, in Cesano -> Command and Services Company
 Cadets Battalion, in Cesano
 Infantry Complement Officer Cadets School, in Ascoli Piceno ->  235th Infantry (Recruits Training) Battalion "Piceno" (BAR) (assigned the flag of the 235th Infantry Regiment "Piceno") --> Comando Artiglieria Controaerei dell'Esercito
  Infantry Complement Non-commissioned Officers Cadets School, in Spoleto
  Equestrian Military School, in Montelibretti
 General Officer Alpine Troops -> disbanded
  Alpine Military School (SMALP), in Aosta
 Command Unit, in Aosta -> Command and Services Company
 Cadets Battalion, in Aosta
 Alpine Troops Skiers Group, in Aosta
 Light Aviation Unit (SMALP), at Pollein Heliport -> 545th Multirole Helicopters Squadron / 54th Multirole Helicopters Squadrons Group "Cefeo" / 4th Army Aviation Regiment "Altair"
 General Officer Parachute Troops -> disbanded
  Parachuting Military School, in Pisa
 Command Unit, in Pisa -> Command and Services Company
 Paratrooper Recruits Training Battalion "Folgore", in Pisa ->  3rd Paratroopers (Recruits Training) Battalion "Poggio Rusco" (BAR) (assigned the flag of the 185th Paratroopers Regiment "Folgore") --> Paratroopers Brigade "Folgore"
 new: Cadets Battalion, in Pisa
 General Officer Armored Troops -> General Officer for mechanized and armored units of infantry and cavalry
  Mechanized and Armored Troops School (SCUTMEC), in Caserta -> Armored Troops School
 Command Unit, in Caserta -> Command and Services Company
 Cadets Battalion, in Caserta
 Tank Training Battalion, in Caserta -> Tank-Armored Battalion
 Mechanized and Armored Troops Squad Commanders Cadets School, in Lecce ->  Armored Troops Specialists School
 Light Aviation Unit SCUTMEC, at Pontecagnano Airport -> merged into the 20th Light Airplanes and Helicopters Squadrons Group "Andromeda"
 Physical Education Military School, in Orvieto
 1st Athletes Company, in Rome
 2nd Athletes Company, in Naples
 3rd Athletes Company, in Bologna

Artillery Inspectorate 
 Artillery Inspectorate, in Rome -> Artillery and NBC-defense Inspectorate
 Secretariat and Personnel Office
 Studies, Regulations, Schools Office -> disbanded
 General Officer Field Artillery
 Field Artillery Office
  Artillery School, in Bracciano
 Command Unit, in Bracciano
 VIII Army Corps Self-propelled Field Artillery Group, in Bracciano ->  1st Self-propelled Field Artillery Group "Cacciatori delle Alpi" (assigned the flag of the 1st Artillery Regiment "Cacciatori delle Alpi")
 Artillery Officer and Non-Commissioned Officer Cadets School, in Foligno
 Complement Officer Cadets Group, in Bracciano
 Logistic Unit, in Bracciano
 General Officer Anti-aircraft Artillery
 Anti-aircraft Artillery Office
  Anti-aircraft Artillery School, in Sabaudia
 Command Unit, in Sabaudia
 I Anti-aircraft Artillery Group, in Sabaudia
 Cadets Group, in Sabaudia
 Logistic Unit, in Sabaudia
 Artillery Electronic Technicians School, in Rome -> disbanded

Engineering Inspectorate 
 Engineering Inspectorate, in Rome
 Secretariat and Personnel Office
 I Office: Regulations, Training and Schools -> Training and Studies Office
 II Office: Studies and Experiences -> Research and Army General Staff Studies Office
 III Office: Works and Property -> Works and Property Office
 General Officer Engineering -> Deputy-Inspector Engineering
  Pioneer Engineering School, in Rome-Cecchignola ->  Engineering School
 new: Command and Services Company, in Rome-Cecchignola
 I Courses Battalion, in Rome-Cecchignola -> 1st Complement Officer Cadets Battalion
 II Specialized Cadets Battalion, in Rome-Cecchignola -> 2nd Specialized Cadets Battalion
 III Specialized Cadets Battalion, in Rome-Cecchignola -> 3rd Specialized Cadets Battalion
 IV Training Battalion, in Rome-Cecchignola -> 4th Pioneer Cadets Battalion

Signal Inspectorate 
 Signal Inspectorate, in Rome
 Secretariat and Personnel Office
 I Office: Studies, Regulations, Materiels, and Electronic Warfare -> Training and Studies Office
 II Office: Plans, Procedures, and Cypher -> Plans, Procedures, and Cypher Office
 III Office: Telecommunications -> Telecommunications Office
 X Signal Battalion, in Rome (supports the Defense Ministry ->  10th Signal Battalion "Lanciano" (assigned the flag of the 3rd Engineer Regiment (Telegraphers))
 XI Signal Battalion, in Bologna ->  11th Signal Battalion "Leonessa" (granted a new flag) ʘ-> Civitavecchia
  Armed Forces Telecommunications School, in Chiavari
 new: Command and Services Company, in Chiavari
 Cadets Battalion, in Chiavari
 General Officer Signals -> Deputy-Inspector Signals
  Signal School, in Rome-Cecchignola
 new: Command and Services Company, in Rome-Cecchignola
 I Courses Battalion, in Rome-Cecchignola -> 1st Complement Officer Cadets Battalion
 II Specialized Cadets Battalion, in Rome-Cecchignola -> 2nd Specialized Cadets Battalion
 III Specialized Cadets Battalion, in Rome-Cecchignola -> 3rd Specialized Cadets Battalion
  Electronic Defense Center, in Anzio (granted a new flag)
 IX Electronic Warfare Battalion, in Anzio ->  9th Electronic Warfare Battalion "Rombo" (granted a new flag)
 SIGINT Unit, in Anzio ->  8th Signals Intelligence Battalion "Tonale" (granted a new flag)
  Signal Specialists School, in San Giorgio a Cremano

NBC-defense Inspectorate 
 NBC-defense Inspectorate, in Rome -> disbanded
 Secretariat and Personnel Office
 Civil Protection Support Advisory and Study Cell
 NBC-Defense Department -> disbanded
 Studies, Regulations, Training Office
 Technical Instruction, Equipment Loads Office
 NBC-Network Control Center Cell
 Atomic Coordination Section
 Armed Forces Atomic, Biological, Chemical Defense School, in Rieti -> Armed Forces Nuclear, Biological, Chemical Defense School --> Artillery and NBC-defense Inspectorate
 NBC-defense Battalion, in Rieti ->  1st NBC Battalion "Etruria" (assigned the flag of the Chemical Regiment)  --> Artillery and NBC-defense Inspectorate

Army Logistic Inspectorate 
 Army Logistic Inspectorate, in Rome
 Secretariat and Personnel Section
 Coordination Office
 Statistics-Data Processing-Coordination Office (STAMECO)
 Studies Office
 Arms, Ammunition, and NBC-defense Materiel Office
 Engineering and Signal Materiel Office
 Army Light Aviation Materiel Office
 new: Supply Programs Office
 new: Logistic Organization Office
 Commissariat Materiel Office (coordinates with the Military Commissariat Service)
 Motorization Materiel Office (coordinates with the Automotive Service)
 Medical Materiel Office (coordinates with the Medical Service)
 Veterinary Service Materiel Section (coordinates with the Military Veterinary Service)
 Army Arsenal, in Naples
 Army Arsenal, in Piacenza
 Arms Factory, in Terni -> in 1978: Light Armament Military Plant
 Army Fuse Factory, in Torre Annunziata -> Terrestrial Ammunition Military Plant (Fuses Division)
 Army Pyrotechnics, in Capua -> Detached Section (Pyrotechnics Division) --> Terrestrial Ammunition Military Plant
 Army Powder Factory, in Fontana Liri
 Amy Precision Laboratory, in Rome -> in 1978: Electronic and Precision Materiels Military Plant
 Projecticles Filling Laboratory, in Madonna di Baiano -> Terrestrial Ammunition Military Plant
 Detached Section, in Noceto
 21st Signal Plant, in Rome -> in 1978: Military Engineering Plant
 22nd Military Engineering Plant, in Pavia -> in 1978: Military Engineering Plant
 NBC-defense Materiel Directorate, in Rome -> NBC-defense Materiel Military Plant
 Military Chemical-Pharmaceutical Institute, in Florence -> in 1978: Chemical-Pharmaceutical Military Plant
 Army Tractor Repairs Workshop, in Piacenza -> in 1978: Detached Section Combat Vehicles Plant (Bologna) --> Combat Vehicles Plant
 Armored Vehicles Repairs Workshop, in Bologna -> in 1978: Combat Vehicles Plant
 Armored Vehicles Repairs Workshop, in Nola -> in 1978: Combat Vehicles Plant
 Graphic Workshop, in Gaeta -> Graphic Military Plant
 new: Arms and Ammunition Military Technical Center, in Rome
 Artillery Experiences Center, in Nettuno
 Engineering Technical Center, in Rome -> Engineering Military Technical Center
 Signal Technical Center, in Rome -> Signals Military Technical Center
 Commissariat Technical Center, in Turin -> Commissariat Military Technical Center
 Motorization Studies and Experiences Center, in Rome -> in 1978: Motorization Military Technical Center
 Vehicles and Spares Supply Center, in Turin
 Army Aero-photographic Reproduction Center, in Villafranca
 Chemical, Physical, and Biological Technical Center, in Rome -> NBC-defense Military Technical Center ʘ-> Civitavecchia
 new: 4th Light Army Aviation Repairs Battalion, at Viterbo Airport

Office of the Inspector of Army Light Aviation 
 Office of the Inspector of Army Light Aviation, in Rome -> Army Light Aviation Inspectorate
 Secretariat and Personnel Office
 I Flight-cooperation Office -> disbanded
 II Training, Courses, Flight Safety, and Personnel Office -> disbanded
 III Army Light Aviation Materiel and Experiences Office -> disbanded
  Army Light Aviation Training Center, at Viterbo Airport -> Army Light Aviation Center
 Training Office -> Operations, Training, Information Office
 Administration Office -> disbanded
 Command Unit, at Viterbo Airport -> Courses Unit
 Flight Unit, at Viterbo Airport -> Aircraft Unit
 new:  1st Army Light Aviation Grouping "Antares", at Viterbo Airport (granted a new flag)
 Medium Helicopter Battalion, at Viterbo Airport (CH-47C Chinook helicopters) -> 11th Medium Transport Helicopters Squadrons Group "Ercole" and 12th Medium Transport Helicopters Squadrons Group "Gru"
 I General Use Helicopters Battalion, at Viterbo Airport (AB 204/205 helicopters) -> 51st Multirole Helicopters Squadrons Group "Leone"
 XXX Light Aviation Battalion, at Padua Airport (AB 204/205 helicopters -> III General Use Helicopters Battalion --> III Army Corps; on 19 February 1976 -> 53rd Multirole Helicopters Squadrons Group "Cassiopea"
 Light Airplanes Section, at Alghero Airport (SISMI support unit, SM.1019A planes) -> 399th Light Airplanes Squadron ʘ-> Guidonia Airport

III Army Corps 
  III Army Corps, in Milan ->  3rd Army Corps
 new: 3rd Army Corps Command Unit, in Milan
  Horse Artillery Regiment, in Milan
 Command and Services Battery, in Milan
 I 155/23 Self-propelled Group, in Milan (M44 155mm self-propelled howitzers)
 II 155/23 Self-propelled Group, in Milan (M44 155mm self-propelled howitzers)
 III 155/23 Self-propelled Group, in Milan (M44 155mm self-propelled howitzers) -> III 155/45 Cannons Group -> M59 155mm towed howitzers
 Horse Battery (Ceremonial unit with horse-drawn 75/27 mod 12 cannons)
  52nd Heavy Artillery Regiment, in Brescia -> disbanded
 Command and Services Battery, in Brescia -> disbanded
 I 155/45 Cannons Group, in Brescia (M59 155mm towed howitzers) ->  52nd Field Artillery Group "Venaria" (assigned the flag of the 52nd Artillery Regiment "Torino") -> M114 155mm towed howitzers --> Mechanized Brigade "Brescia"
 II 155/45 Cannons Group, in Brescia (M59 155mm towed howitzers) -> IV 155/45 Cannons Group (Reserve) / Horse Artillery Regiment ʘ-> Cremona
 III 155/45 Cannons Group (Reserve), in Brescia (M59 155mm towed howitzers) -> disbanded
 IV 203/25 Howitzers Group, in Brescia (M115 203mm towed howitzers) -> V 203/25 Howitzers Group / Horse Artillery Regiment
 V 203/25 Howitzers Group (Reserve), in Brescia (M115 203mm towed howitzers) -> disbanded
 III Artillery Specialists Group, in Milan -> 30th Artillery Specialists Group "Brianza" (Reserve - 1x company active and assigned to the Horse Artillery Regiment)
 III Light Aviation Battalion, at Bresso Airport (L-21B Super Cup) -> 23rd Light Airplanes and Helicopters Squadrons Group "Eridano"
 III Army Corps Engineer Battalion, in Pavia ->  3rd Engineer Battalion "Lario" (assigned the flag of the 10th Engineer Regiment)
 III Army Corps Signal Battalion, in Milan ->  3rd Signal Battalion "Spluga" (assigned the flag of the 1st Radio-Telegraphers Regiment)
 III Army Corps Transport Group, in Milan ->  3rd Army Corps Transport Group "Fulvia" (granted a new flag)
 III Supply, Repairs, Recovery Battalion, in Milan -> 3rd Supply, Repairs, Recovery Battalion
 3rd Light Army Aviation Repairs Unit, at Orio al Serio Airport --> Army Logistic Inspectorate

Armored Division "Centauro" 

  Armored Division "Centauro", in Novara
 new: Command Unit "Centauro", in Novara
  1st Armored Bersaglieri Regiment, in Civitavecchia -> disbanded
 Command and Services Company, in Civitavecchia (includes an anti-tank guided missile platoon) -> disbanded
 I Bersaglieri Battalion, in Civitavecchia (M113 APCs) ->  1st Bersaglieri Battalion "La Marmora" (assigned the flag of the 1st Bersaglieri Regiment) --> Mechanized Brigade "Granatieri di Sardegna"
 VI Tank Battalion, in Civitavecchia (M47 Patton tanks) ->  6th Tank Battalion "M.O. Scapuzzi" (assigned the flag of the 33rd Tank Regiment) --> Mechanized Brigade "Granatieri di Sardegna"
 XVIII Tank Battalion, in Civitavecchia (M47 Patton tanks) -> disbanded
  3rd Bersaglieri Regiment, in Milan ->  3rd Mechanized Brigade "Goito"
 Command and Services Company, in Milan (includes an anti-tank guided missile platoon) -> Command and Signal Unit "Goito"
 IV Tank Battalion, in Solbiate Olona (M47 Patton tanks) ->  4th Tank Battalion "M.O. Passalacqua" (granted a new flag) -> Leopard 1A2 main battle tanks
 XVIII Bersaglieri Battalion, in Milan (M113 APCs) ->  18th Bersaglieri Battalion "Poggio Scanno" (assigned the flag of the 3rd Bersaglieri Regiment)
 XXV Bersaglieri Battalion, in Solbiate Olona (M113 APCs) ->  10th Bersaglieri Battalion "Bezzecca" (assigned the flag of the 7th Bersaglieri Regiment)
 new: Anti-tank Company "Goito", in Turin
 new: Engineer Company "Goito", in Novara
  31st Tank Regiment, in Bellinzago Novarese ->  31st Armored Brigade "Curtatone"
 Command and Services Company, in Bellinzago Novarese (includes an anti-tank guided missile platoon) -> Command and Signal Unit "Curtatone"
 I Tank Battalion, in Bellinzago Novarese (M47 Patton tanks) ->  1st Tank Battalion "M.O. Cracco" (assigned the flag of the 31st Tank Regiment) -> Leopard 1A2 main battle tanks
 II Tank Battalion, in Bellinzago Novarese (M47 Patton tanks) ->  101st Tank Battalion "M.O. Zappala" (assigned the flag of the 131st Tank Regiment) -> Leopard 1A2 main battle tanks
 XXVIII Bersaglieri Battalion, in Bellinzago Novarese (M113 APCs) ->  28th Bersaglieri Battalion "Oslavia" (assigned the flag of the 9th Bersaglieri Regiment)
 new: Anti-tank Company "Curtatone", in Bellinzago Novarese
 new: Engineer Company "Curtatone", in Novara
  131st Armored Artillery Regiment, in Vercelli -> Divisional Artillery Command
 Command and Services Battery, in Vercelli -> Artillery Specialists Group "Centauro"
 I Self-propelled Field Artillery Group, in Vercelli (M109G 155mm self-propelled howitzers) ->  131st Heavy Field Artillery Group "Vercelli" (assigned the flag of the 131st Armored Artillery Regiment "Centauro") -> M114 155mm towed howitzers
 II Self-propelled Field Artillery Group, in Civitavecchia (M109G 155mm self-propelled howitzers) ->  13th Field Artillery Group "Magliana" (assigned the flag of the 13th Artillery Regiment "Granatieri di Sardegna") -> M114 155mm towed howitzers --> Mechanized Brigade "Granatieri di Sardegna"
 III Self-propelled Field Artillery Group, in Novara (M109G 155mm self-propelled howitzers) -> disbanded
 IV Heavy Self-propelled Field Artillery Group, in Vercelli (M44 155mm self-propelled howitzers) ->  9th Self-propelled Field Artillery Group "Brennero" (assigned the flag of the 9th Artillery Regiment "Brennero") --> 31st Armored Brigade "Curtatone"
 V Heavy Self-propelled Artillery Group, in Vercelli (M55 203mm self-propelled howitzers) ->  205th Heavy Field Artillery Group "Lomellina" (assigned the flag of the 205th Artillery Regiment "Bologna") -> M114 155mm towed howitzers
 VI Light Anti-aircraft Artillery Group (Reserve), in Vercelli (Bofors 40mm anti-aircraft guns and 12.7mm anti-aircraft machine guns) -> 11th Light Anti-aircraft Artillery Group "Falco" (Reserve)
 Artillery Specialists Battery, in Vercelli -> Artillery Specialists Group "Centauro"
 Squadrons Group "Cavalleggeri di Lodi", in Lenta (Fiat Campagnola reconnaissance vehicles and M47 Patton tanks) ->  15th Squadrons Group "Cavalleggeri di Lodi" (assigned the flag of the Regiment "Cavalleggeri di Lodi" (15th))
 Light Aviation Unit "Centauro", at Vercelli Airport (L-19E Bird Dog light aircraft and AB 206 reconnaissance helicopters) -> 46th Reconnaissance Helicopters Squadrons Group "Sagittario"
 Engineer Battalion "Centauro", in Bellinzago Novarese ->  131st Engineer Battalion "Ticino" (assigned the flag of the 9th Engineer Regiment)
 Signal Battalion "Centauro", in Novara ->  231st Signal Battalion "Sempione" (granted a new flag)
 Services Grouping "Centauro", in Novara -> disbanded
 Command and Services Company, in Novara -> disbanded
 Supply, Repairs, Recovery Unit "Centauro", in Bellinzago Novarese ->  Logistic Battalion "Centauro" (granted a new flag)
 Transport Unit "Centauro", in Novara -> disbanded
 I Services Battalion "Centauro" (Reserve), in Milan ->  Logistic Battalion "Goito" (granted a new flag) ʘ-> Monza --> 3rd Mechanized Brigade "Goito"
 II Services Battalion "Centauro", in Civitavecchia ->  Logistic Battalion "Granatieri di Sardegna" (granted a new flag) --> Mechanized Brigade "Granatieri di Sardegna"
 III Services Battalion "Centauro", in Bellinzago Novarese ->  Logistic Battalion "Curtatone" (granted a new flag) --> 31st Armored Brigade "Curtatone"
 new: Medical Battalion "Centauro" (Reserve), in Novara

Infantry Division "Legnano" 

  Infantry Division "Legnano", in Bergamo ->  Mechanized Brigade "Legnano" --> Armored Division "Centauro"
  4th Armored Infantry Regiment, in Legnano -> disbanded
 Command and Services Company, in Legnano (includes an anti-tank guided missile platoon) -> disbanded
 II Bersaglieri Battalion, in Legnano (M113 APCs) ->  2nd Bersaglieri Battalion "Governolo" (assigned the flag of the 2nd Bersaglieri Regiment)
 XX Tank Battalion, in Legnano (M47 Patton tanks) ->  20th Tank Battalion "M.O. Pentimalli" (assigned the flag of the 4th Armored Infantry Regiment) -> Leopard 1A2 main battle tanks
  67th Infantry Regiment "Legnano", in Montorio Veronese ->  Mechanized Brigade "Brescia" ʘ-> Brescia --> Mechanized Division "Mantova"
 Command and Services Company, in Montorio Veronese -> Command and Signal Unit "Brescia" ʘ-> Brescia
 I Infantry Battalion, in Montorio Veronese ->  85th Mechanized Infantry Battalion "Verona" (assigned the flag of the 85th Infantry Regiment "Verona")
 II Infantry Battalion, in Montorio Veronese -> disbanded
 III Infantry Battalion, in Montorio Veronese ->  30th Mechanized Infantry Battalion "Pisa" (assigned the flag of the 30th Infantry Regiment "Pisa")
 IV Mechanized Battalion, in Montorio Veronese (M113 armored personnel carriers and M47 tanks) -> disbanded
 Regimental Anti-tank Company, in Montorio Veronese (anti-tank guided missiles and M47 tanks) -> Anti-tank Company "Brescia"
 new:  Logistic Battalion "Brescia", in Montorio Veronese (granted a new flag)
  68th Infantry Regiment "Legnano", in Bergamo -> disbanded
 Command and Services Company, in Bergamo -> Command and Signal Unit "Legnano"
 I Infantry Battalion, in Bergamo ->  68th Mechanized Infantry Battalion "Palermo" (assigned the flag of the 68th Infantry Regiment "Legnano")
 II Infantry Battalion, in Como ->  23rd Infantry (Recruits Training) Battalion "Como" (BAR) (assigned the flag of the 23rd Infantry Regiment "Como") --> Regione Militare Nord Ovest
 III Infantry Battalion, in Brescia ->  20th Mechanized Infantry Battalion "Monte San Michele" (assigned the flag of the 20th Infantry Regiment "Brescia") --> Mechanized Brigade "Brescia"
 IV Mechanized Battalion, in Monza (M113 armored personnel carriers and M47 tanks) ->  67th Mechanized Infantry Battalion "Montelungo" (assigned the flag of the 67th Infantry Regiment "Legnano")
 Regimental Anti-tank Company, in Monza (anti-tank guided missiles and M47 tanks) -> Anti-tank Company "Legnano"
  11th Field Artillery Regiment, in Cremona -> disbanded
 Command and Services Battery, in Cremona -> disbanded
 I Field Artillery Group, in Cremona (M14/61 105mm towed howitzers) -> disbanded
 II Field Artillery Group, in Cremona (M14/61 105mm towed howitzers) -> disbanded
 III Self-propelled Field Artillery Group, in Vercelli (M7 105mm self-propelled howitzers) ->  3rd Field Artillery Group "Pastrengo" (assigned the flag of the 3rd Artillery Regiment "Pistoia") -> M114 155mm towed howitzers --> 3rd Mechanized Brigade "Goito"
 IV Heavy Field Artillery Group, in Cremona (M114 155mm towed howitzers) ->  11th Field Artillery Group "Monferrato" (assigned the flag of the 11th Artillery Regiment "Legnano")
 V Light Anti-aircraft Artillery Group (Reserve), in (?) (Bofors 40mm anti-aircraft guns and 12.7mm anti-aircraft machine guns) -> disbanded
 Artillery Specialists Battery, in Cremona -> disbanded
 Squadrons Group "Lancieri di Milano", in Monza (Fiat Campagnola reconnaissance vehicles and M47 Patton tanks) ->  7th Squadrons Group "Lancieri di Milano" (assigned the flag of the Regiment "Lancieri di Milano" (7th)) ʘ-> Remanzacco --> Mechanized Division "Mantova"
 Engineer Battalion "Legnano", in Verona -> split into Engineer Company "Legnano" and Engineer Company "Brescia" ʘ-> Bergamo respectively ʘ-> Brescia
 Signal Battalion "Legnano", in Bergamo -> disbanded
 Services Grouping "Legnano", in Presezzo ->  Logistic Battalion "Legnano" (granted a new flag)
 Command Platoono, in Presezzo
 Supply, Repairs, Recovery Unit "Legnano", in Orio al Serio -> disbanded
 Transport Unit "Legnano", in Presezzo -> disbanded
 Medical Battalion "Legnano" (Reserve), in Presezzo (includes the 5th Field Hospital) -> disbanded
 Provisions Supply Company "Legnano", in Presezzo -> disbanded

Infantry Division "Cremona" 

  Infantry Division "Cremona", in Turin ->  Motorized Brigade "Cremona"
  21st Infantry Regiment "Cremona", in Alessandria -> disbanded
 Command and Services Company, in Alessandria -> disbanded
 I Infantry Battalion, in Alessandria -> disbanded and equipment stored (In case of war would have been activated as 50th Motorized Infantry Battalion "Parma" and would have been assigned the flag of the 50th Infantry Regiment "Parma")
 II Infantry Battalion, in Alessandria ->  21st Motorized Infantry Battalion "Alfonsine" (assigned the flag of the 21st Infantry Regiment "Cremona")
 III Infantry Battalion, in Asti -> Detachment 23rd Infantry (Recruits Training) Battalion "Como" (BAR); in 1977 ->  4th Infantry (Recruits Training) Battalion "Guastalla" (BAR) (assigned the flag of the 4th Infantry Regiment "Piemonte") --> 3rd Army Corps
 IV Mechanized Battalion, in Fossano (M113 armored personnel carriers and M47 tanks) ->  22nd Infantry (Recruits Training) Battalion "Primaro" (BAR) (assigned the flag of the 22nd Infantry Regiment "Cremona")
 Regimental Anti-tank Company, in (?) (anti-tank guided missiles and M47 tanks) -> disbanded
  22nd Armored Infantry Regiment "Cremona", in Turin -> disbanded
 Command and Services Company, in Turin (includes an anti-tank guided missile platoon) -> Command and Signal Unit "Cremona"
 VI Bersaglieri Battalion, in Turin (M113 armored personnel carriers) ->  6th Bersaglieri Battalion "Palestro" (assigned the flag of the 6th Bersaglieri Regiment) --> 3rd Mechanized Brigade "Goito"
 XIV Tank Battalion, in Pinerolo (M47 Patton tanks) -> disbanded
  157th Infantry Regiment "Liguria", in Genoa -> disbanded
 Command and Services Company, in Genoa -> disbanded
 I Infantry Battalion, in Genoa ->  26th Infantry (Recruits Training) Battalion "Bergamo" (BAR) (assigned the flag of the 26th Infantry Regiment "Bergamo") ʘ-> Diano Castello --> Armored Division "Centauro"
 II Infantry Battalion, in Genoa -> disbanded
 III Infantry Battalion, in Genoa -> disbanded
 IV Mechanized Battalion, in Novi Ligure (M113 armored personnel carriers and M47 tanks) ->  157th Motorized Infantry Battalion "Liguria" (assigned the flag of the 157th Infantry Regiment "Liguria")
 Regimental Anti-tank Company, in (?) (anti-tank guided missiles and M47 tanks) -> disbanded
  7th Field Artillery Regiment, in Turin -> disbanded
 Command and Services Battery, in Turin -> disbanded
 I Field Artillery Group, in Turin (M14/61 105mm towed howitzers) -> disbanded
 II Field Artillery Group, in Acqui (M14/61 105mm towed howitzers) -> disbanded
 III Self-propelled Field Artillery Group, in Acqui (M7 105mm self-propelled howitzers) -> disbanded
 IV Heavy Field Artillery Group, in Turin (M114 155mm towed howitzers) ->  7th Field Artillery Group "Adria" (assigned the flag of the 7th Artillery Regiment "Cremona")
 V Light Anti-aircraft Artillery Group (Reserve), in (?) (Bofors 40mm anti-aircraft guns and 12.7mm anti-aircraft machine guns) -> disbanded
 Artillery Specialists Battery, in Turin -> disbanded
 Squadrons Group "Nizza Cavalleria", in Pinerolo (Fiat Campagnola reconnaissance vehicles and M47 Patton tanks) ->  1st Armored Squadrons Group "Nizza Cavalleria" (assigned the flag of the Regiment "Nizza Cavalleria" (1st))
 Light Aviation Unit "Cremona", at Venaria Reale Airport (L-19E Bird Dog light aircraft and AB 206 reconnaissance helicopters) -> disbanded
 Engineer Battalion "Cremona", in Turin -> disbanded
 Signal Battalion "Cremona", in Venaria Reale -> disbanded
 new: Engineer Company "Cremona", in Pinerolo
 new: Anti-tank Company "Cremona", in Turin
 Services Grouping "Cremona", in Turin ->  Logistic Battalion "Cremona" (granted a new flag)
 Command Platoon, in Turin
 Supply, Repairs, Recovery Unit "Cremona", in Venaria Reale -> disbanded
 Transport Unit "Cremona", in Turin -> disbanded
 Medical Battalion "Cremona" (Reserve), in Turin -> disbanded
 Provisions Supply Company "Cremona", in Turin -> disbanded

IV Alpine Army Corps 
 IV Alpine Army Corps, in Bolzano -> 4th Alpine Army Corps
 new: 4th Alpine Army Corps Command Unit, in Bolzano
  2nd Alpini Regiment (CAR), in Cuneo -> disbanded
 Command and Services Company, in Cuneo -> disbanded
 Alpini Battalion "Orobica", in Cuneo ->  Alpini (Recruits Training) Battalion "Mondovì" (BAR) (assigned the flag of the 1st Alpini Regiment) --> Alpine Brigade "Taurinense"
 Alpini Battalion "Tridentina", in Cuneo -> disbanded
 Alpini Battalion "Taurinense", in Bra -> disbanded
  2nd Engineer Regiment, in Bolzano -> disbanded
 Command and Services Company, in Bolzano -> disbanded
 II Mining Engineer Battalion, in Bolzano ->  2nd Mining Engineer Battalion "Iseo" (assigned the flag of the 2nd Engineer Regiment)
 IV Engineer Battalion, in Bolzano -> disbanded
 VII Engineer Battalion, in Riva del Garda -> disbanded
 XIV Army Corps Engineer Battalion, in Trento ->  4th Engineer Battalion "Orta" (assigned the flag of the 4th Engineer Regiment)
 1st Cable Car Company, in Trento -> disbanded
 Mixed Photoelectric-Camouflage Company, in Trento -> disbanded
  Regiment "Savoia Cavalleria" (3rd), in Meran -> disbanded
 Command and Services Squadron, in Meran -> disbanded
 I Squadrons Group, in Meran (M47 Patton tanks and M113 armored personnel carriers) ->  3rd Armored Squadrons Group "Savoia Cavalleria" (assigned the flag of the Regiment "Savoia Cavalleria" (3rd))
 II Squadrons Group, in Meran (M47 Patton tanks and M113 armored personnel carriers) -> disbanded
 III Squadrons Group, in Meran (M47 Patton tanks and M113 armored personnel carriers) -> disbanded
  4th Heavy Field Artillery Regiment, in Trento (flag of the 4th Army Corps Artillery Regiment)
 Command and Services Battery, in Trento
 I 155/23 Howitzers Group, in Trento (M114 155mm towed howitzers)
 II 155/23 Howitzers Group, in Trento (M114 155mm towed howitzers)
 III 155/23 Howitzers Group (Reserve), in Trento (M114 155mm towed howitzers) -> disbanded
 IV 155/45 Cannons Group, in Trento (M59 155mm towed howitzers) (former II 155/45 Cannons Group / 9th Heavy Artillery Regiment, transferred in 1973) -> (Reserve)
 V 155/45 Cannons Group, in Trento (M59 155mm towed howitzers) (former III 155/45 Cannons Group / 9th Heavy Artillery Regiment, transferred in 1973)
 III Self-propelled Field Artillery Group, in Trento (M7 105mm self-propelled howitzers) ->  10th Self-propelled Field Artillery Group "Avisio" (assigned the flag of the 10th Army Corps Artillery Regiment) -> M44 155mm self-propelled howitzers
 IV Artillery Specialists Group, in Trento ->  4th Artillery Specialists Group "Bondone" (assigned the flag of the 3rd Army Corps Artillery Regiment)
 new:  4th Army Light Aviation Grouping "Altair", at Bolzano Airport (granted a new flag)
 IV Light Aviation Battalion, at Bolzano Airport (L-21B Super Cup) -> 24th Light Airplanes and Helicopters Squadrons Group "Orione" --> 4th Army Light Aviation Grouping "Altair"
 IV General Use Helicopters Battalion, at Bolzano Airport(AB 204/205 helicopters) -> 54th Multirole Helicopters Squadrons Group "Cefeo" --> 4th Army Light Aviation Grouping "Altair"
 IV Army Corps Signal Battalion, in Bolzano ->  4th Signal Battalion "Gardena" (assigned the flag of the 2nd Radio-Telegraphers Regiment)
 IV Army Corps Transport Group, in Eppan ->  4th Army Corps Transport Group "Claudia" (granted a new flag)
 IV Supply, Repairs, Recovery Battalion, in Bolzano
 VII Mechanized Carabinieri Battalion "Trentino-Alto Adige", in Laives (M47 Patton tanks and M113 APCs) -> 7th Carabinieri Battalion "M. O. Petruccelli" (granted a new flag)
 Alpini Paratroopers Company, in Bolzano

Alpine Brigade "Taurinense" 

  Alpine Brigade "Taurinense", in Turin
  4th Alpini Regiment, in Turin -> disbanded
 Command and Services Company, in Turin -> disbanded
 Alpini Battalion "Saluzzo", in Borgo San Dalmazzo ->  Alpini Battalion "Saluzzo" (assigned the flag of the 2nd Alpini Regiment)
 Alpini Battalion "Susa", in Pinerolo ->  Alpini Battalion "Susa" (assigned the flag of the 3rd Alpini Regiment)
 Alpini Battalion "Aosta", in Aosta ->  Alpini Battalion "Aosta" (assigned the flag of the 4th Alpini Regiment) --> Military Alpine School
  1st Mountain Artillery Regiment, in Rivoli -> disbanded
 Command and Services Battery, in Rivoli -> disbanded
 Mountain Artillery Group "Mondovì", in Mondovì (M56 105mm pack howitzers) -> disbanded
 Mountain Artillery Group "Susa", in Susa (M56 105mm pack howitzers) ->  Mountain Artillery Group "Pinerolo" (assigned the flag of the 4th Mountain Artillery Regiment)
 Mountain Artillery Group "Aosta", in Saluzzo (M56 105mm pack howitzers) ->  Mountain Artillery Group "Aosta" (assigned the flag of the 1st Mountain Artillery Regiment)
 Light Aviation Unit "Taurinense", at Venaria Reale Airport (L-19E Bird Dog) -> 442nd Reconnaissance Helicopters Squadron / 44th Reconnaissance Helicopters Squadrons Group "Fenice" / 4th Army Light Aviation Grouping "Altair"
 new: Alpini Anti-tank Company "Taurinense", in Turin
 Alpini Engineer Company "Taurinense", in Turin
 Alpini Signal Company "Taurinense", in Abbadia Alpina -> Alpini Command and Signal Unit "Taurinense"
 Services Grouping "Taurinense", in Rivoli ->  Logistic Battalion "Taurinense" (granted a new flag)
 Command Platoon, in Rivoli
 Supply, Repairs, Recovery Unit "Taurinense", in Rivoli -> disbanded
 Medical Battalion "Taurinense", in Rivoli -> disbanded
 Transport Unit "Taurinense", in Rivoli -> disbanded
 Provisions Supply Company "Taurinense", in Rivoli -> disbanded

Alpine Brigade "Orobica" 

  Alpine Brigade "Orobica", in Meran
  5th Alpini Regiment, in Meran -> disbanded
 Command and Services Company, in Meran -> disbanded
 Alpini Battalion "Morbegno", in Sterzing ->  Alpini Battalion "Morbegno" (assigned the flag of the 5th Alpini Regiment)
 Alpini Battalion "Tirano", in Mals and Glurns ->  Alpini Battalion "Tirano" (granted a new flag)
 Alpini Battalion "Edolo", in Meran ->  Alpini (Recruits Training) Battalion "Edolo" (BAR) (granted a new flag)
  5th Mountain Artillery Regiment, in Meran -> disbanded
 Command and Services Battery, in Meran -> disbanded
 Mountain Artillery Group "Bergamo", in Schlanders (M56 105mm pack howitzers) ->  Mountain Artillery Group "Bergamo" (assigned the flag of the 5th Mountain Artillery Regiment)
 Mountain Artillery Group "Sondrio", in Sterzing (M56 105mm pack howitzers) ->  Mountain Artillery Group "Sondrio" (granted a new flag)
 Mountain Artillery Group "Vestone", in Meran (M56 105mm pack howitzers) -> disbanded
 Alpini Fortification Battalion "Val Chiese", in Sterzing and Glurns ->  Alpini Fortification Battalion "Val Chiese" (assigned the flag of the 22nd Alpini Fortification Grouping)
 Light Aviation Unit "Orobica", at Bolzano Airport (L-19E Bird Dog) -> disbanded
 new: Alpini Anti-tank Company "Orobica", in Meran
 Alpini Engineer Company "Orobica", in Meran
 Alpini Signal Company "Orobica", in Meran -> Alpini Command and Signal Unit "Orobica"
 Services Grouping "Orobica", in Meran ->  Logistic Battalion "Orobica" (granted a new flag)
 Command Platoon, in Meran
 Supply, Repairs, Recovery Unit "Orobica", in Meran -> disbanded
 Medical Battalion "Orobica", in Meran -> disbanded
 Transport Unit "Orobica", in Meran -> disbanded
 Provisions Supply Company "Orobica", in Meran -> disbanded

Alpine Brigade "Tridentina" 

  Alpine Brigade "Tridentina", in Brixen
  6th Alpini Regiment, in Bruneck -> disbanded
 Command and Services Company, in Bruneck -> disbanded
 Alpini Battalion "Bassano", in Innichen ->  Alpini Battalion "Bassano" (assigned the flag of the 6th Alpini Regiment)
 Alpini Battalion "Trento", in Welsberg ->  Alpini Battalion "Trento" (assigned the flag of the 11th Alpini Regiment)
 Alpini Battalion "Bolzano", in Brixen -> disbanded and equipment stored (In case of war would have been activated as Alpini Battalion "Bolzano" and would have been granted a new flag)
  2nd Mountain Artillery Regiment, in Elvas -> disbanded
 Command and Services Battery, in Elvas -> disbanded
 Mountain Artillery Group "Verona", in Elvas (M56 105mm pack howitzers) -> disbanded
 Mountain Artillery Group "Vicenza", in Bruneck (M56 105mm pack howitzers) ->  Mountain Artillery Group "Vicenza" (assigned the flag of the 2nd Mountain Artillery Regiment)
 Mountain Artillery Group "Asiago", in Toblach (M56 105mm pack howitzers) ->  Mountain Artillery Group "Asiago" (granted a new flag)
 Alpini Fortification Battalion "Val Brenta", in Innichen ->  Alpini Fortification Battalion "Val Brenta" ʘ-> Bruneck (assigned the flag of the 21st Alpini Fortification Grouping)
 Light Aviation Unit "Tridentina", at Toblach Airport (L-19E Bird Dog) -> disbanded
 new: Alpini Anti-tank Company "Tridentina", in Bruneck
 Alpini Engineer Company "Tridentina", in Brixen
 Alpini Signal Company "Tridentina", in Brixen -> Alpini Command and Signal Unit "Tridentina"
 Services Grouping "Tridentina", in Vahrn ->  Logistic Battalion "Tridentina" (granted a new flag)
 Command Platoon, in Vahrn
 Supply, Repairs, Recovery Unit "Tridentina", in Vahrn -> disbanded
 Medical Battalion "Tridentina", in Vahrn -> disbanded
 Transport Unit "Tridentina", in Vahrn -> disbanded
 Provisions Supply Company "Tridentina", in Vahrn -> disbanded

Carnia-Cadore Troops Command 
 Carnia-Cadore Troops Command, in San Daniele del Friuli -> disbanded
 VII Army Corps Signal Battalion, in Bassano -> 7th Signal Company --> 4th Signal Battalion "Gardena"
 VII Light Aviation Battalion, at Campoformido Airport -> disbanded

Alpine Brigade "Cadore" 

  Alpine Brigade "Cadore", in Belluno
  7th Alpini Regiment, in Belluno -> disbanded
 Command and Services Company, in Belluno -> disbanded
 Alpini Battalion "Feltre", in Feltre and Strigno ->  Alpini Battalion "Feltre" (assigned the flag of the 7th Alpini Regiment)
 Alpini Battalion "Belluno", in Belluno and Agordo ->  Alpini (Recruits Training) Battalion "Belluno" (BAR) (granted a new flag)
 Alpini Battalion "Pieve di Cadore", in Tai di Cadore ->  Alpini Battalion "Pieve di Cadore" (granted a new flag)
  6th Mountain Artillery Regiment, in Belluno -> disbanded
 Command and Services Battery, in Belluno -> disbanded
 Mountain Artillery Group "Lanzo", in Belluno (M56 105mm pack howitzers) ->  Mountain Artillery Group "Lanzo" (assigned the flag of the 6th Mountain Artillery Regiment)
 Mountain Artillery Group "Agordo", in Feltre (M56 105mm pack howitzers) ->  disbanded, name and traditions transferred to the Mountain Artillery Group "Pieve di Cadore"
 Mountain Artillery Group "Pieve di Cadore", in Bassano (M56 105mm pack howitzers) ->  Mountain Artillery Group "Agordo" (granted a new flag)
 Alpini Battalion "Val Cismon", in Santo Stefano di Cadore -> disbanded; 264th Company and three reserve companies --> Alpini Fortification Battalion "Val Brenta"
 Light Aviation Unit "Cadore", at Belluno Airport (L-19E Bird Dog) -> 44th Reconnaissance Helicopters Squadrons Group "Fenice" --> 4th Army Light Aviation Grouping "Altair"
 new: Alpini Anti-tank Company "Cadore", in Belluno
 Alpini Engineer Company "Cadore", in Belluno
 Alpini Signal Company "Cadore", in Belluno -> Alpini Command and Signal Unit "Cadore"
 Services Grouping "Cadore", in Belluno ->  Logistic Battalion "Cadore" (granted a new flag)
 Command Platoon, in Belluno
 Supply, Repairs, Recovery Unit "Cadore", in Belluno -> disbanded
 Medical Battalion "Cadore", in Belluno -> disbanded
 Transport Unit "Cadore", in Belluno -> disbanded
 Provisions Supply Company "Cadore", in Belluno -> disbanded

Alpine Brigade "Julia" 

  Alpine Brigade "Julia", in Udine
  8th Alpini Regiment, in Tolmezzo -> disbanded
 Command and Services Company, in Tolmezzo -> disbanded
 Alpini Battalion "Tolmezzo", in Venzone and Moggio Udinese -> disbanded, name and traditions transferred to the Alpini Battalion "Mondovì"
 Alpini Battalion "Gemona", in Pontebba and Ugovizza -> disbanded, name and traditions transferred to the Alpini Battalion "L'Aquila"
 Alpini Battalion "Cividale", in Chiusaforte ->  Alpini Battalion "Cividale" (granted a new flag) ʘ-> Tarvisio
 Alpini Battalion "L'Aquila", in Tarvisio ->  Alpini Battalion "Gemona" (assigned the flag of the 8th Alpini Regiment)
 Alpini Battalion "Mondovì", in Paluzza, Paularo, and Forni Avoltri ->  Alpini Battalion "Tolmezzo" (granted a new flag), "Mondovì" name and traditions transferred to the Alpini Battalion "Orobica" of the 2nd Alpini Regiment (CAR)
  11th Alpini Fortification Grouping, in Tolmezzo -> disbanded
 Command and Services Company, in Tolmezzo -> disbanded
 Alpini Battalion "Val Tagliamento", in Stazione Carnia, Cavazzo Carnico, Tolmezzo and Paluzza ->  Alpini Fortification Battalion "Val Tagliamento" (assigned the flag of the 11th Alpini Fortification Grouping) ʘ-> Tolmezzo
 Alpini Battalion "Val Fella", in Pontebba and Ugovizza -> disbanded; 269th Company and five reserve companies --> Alpini Fortification Battalion "Val Tagliamento"
  3rd Mountain Artillery Regiment, in Gemona -> disbanded
 Command and Services Battery, in Gemona -> disbanded
 Mountain Artillery Group "Belluno", in Tarvisio (M56 105mm pack howitzers) -> disbanded, name and traditions transferred to the Mountain Artillery Group "Osoppo"
 Mountain Artillery Group "Conegliano", in Gemona (M56 105mm pack howitzers) ->  Mountain Artillery Group "Conegliano" (assigned the flag of the 3rd Mountain Artillery Regiment) ʘ-> Udine
 Mountain Artillery Group "Udine", in Tolmezzo (M56 105mm pack howitzers) ->  Mountain Artillery Group "Udine" (granted a new flag)
 Mountain Artillery Group "Pinerolo", in Tolmezzo and Paularo (M56 105mm pack howitzers) -> disbanded, name and traditions transferred to the Mountain Artillery Group "Susa" of the Alpine Brigade "Taurinense"
 Mountain Artillery Group "Osoppo", in Pontebba (M56 105mm pack howitzers) ->  Mountain Artillery Group "Belluno" (granted a new flag)
 Alpini Recruits Training Battalion "Julia", in L'Aquila and Teramo ->  Alpini Battalion "L'Aquila" (granted a new flag)
 new:  Alpini (Recruits Training) Battalion "Vicenza" (BAR), in Tolmezzo (assigned the flag of the 9th Alpini Regiment) ʘ-> Codroipo
 Light Aviation Unit "Julia", at Campoformido Airport (L-19E Bird Dog) -> disbanded
 new: Alpini Anti-tank Company "Julia", in Cavazzo Carnico
 Alpini Engineer Company "Julia", in Gemona
 Alpini Signal Company "Julia", in Udine -> Alpini Command and Signal Unit "Julia"
 Services Grouping "Julia", in Udine ->  Logistic Battalion "Julia" (granted a new flag)
 Command Platoon, in Udine
 Supply, Repairs, Recovery Unit "Julia", in Udine -> disbanded
 Medical Battalion "Julia", in Udine -> disbanded
 Transport Unit "Julia", in Udine -> disbanded
 Provisions Supply Company "Julia", in Udine -> disbanded

V Army Corps 
 V Army Corps, in Vittorio Veneto -> 5th Army Corps
 new: 5th Army Corps Command Unit, in Vittorio Veneto
  Lagunari Regiment "Serenissima", in Venice Lido -> Amphibious Troops Command --> Mechanized Division "Folgore"
 Command and Services Company, in Venice Lido -> Command and Signal Company, in Venice Lido
 Amphibious Battalion "Marghera", in Venice-Malcontenta -> disbanded
 Amphibious Battalion "Piave", in Mestre ->  1st Lagunari Battalion "Serenissima" (assigned the flag of the Lagunari Regiment "Serenissima")
 Amphibious Battalion "Isonzo", in Villa Vicentina ->  41st Mechanized Infantry Battalion "Modena" (assigned the flag of the 41st Infantry Regiment "Modena") --> Mechanized Brigade "Gorizia"
 XXII Tank Battalion, in San Vito al Tagliamento (M47 Patton tanks) ->  22nd Tank Battalion "M.O. Piccinini" (granted a new flag) -> Leopard 1A2 main battle tanks --> Mechanized Brigade "Gorizia"
 Signal Company, in Venice Lido -> disbanded
 Amphibious Transports Company, in Isola di Sant'Andrea and Ca' Vio ->  Amphibious Vehicles Battalion "Sile" (granted a new flag)
  27th Heavy Self-propelled Artillery Regiment, in Udine --> in 1977 to 3ª Brigata Missili "Aquileia"
 Command and Services Battery, in Udine
 I 175/60 Self-propelled Group, in Udine (M107 175mm self-propelled guns)
 II 175/60 Self-propelled Group, in Udine (M107 175mm self-propelled guns)
 III 175/60 Self-propelled Group, in Udine (M107 175mm self-propelled guns) -> disbanded
  41st Heavy Field Artillery Regiment, in Padua -> disbanded,flag and traditions transferred to the 41st Artillery Specialists Group "Cordenons" flag and traditions transferred to the V Artillery Specialists Group
 Command and Services Battery, in Padua -> disbanded
 I 155/45 Cannons Group, in Padua (M59 155mm towed howitzers) -> disbanded
 II 155/23 Howitzers Group, in Padua (M114 155mm towed howitzers) -> disbanded
 III 155/23 Howitzers Group, in Padua (M114 155mm towed howitzers) -> disbanded
 IV 155/23 Howitzers Group (Reserve), in Padua (M114 155mm towed howitzers) -> disbanded
  3rd Sappers Fortification Regiment, in Orcenico Superiore -> disbanded
 Command and Services Company, in Orcenico Superiore -> disbanded
 XXX Sappers Fortification Battalion, in Orcenico Superiore -> disbanded
 XXXI Sappers Fortification Battalion, in Orcenico Superiore ->  3rd Sapper Battalion "Verbano" (assigned the flag of the 3rd Engineer Regiment) ʘ-> Udine
  5th Engineer Regiment, in Udine -> disbanded
 Command and Services Company, in Udine -> disbanded
 I Mining Engineer Battalion, in Udine ->  1st Mining Engineer Battalion "Garda" (assigned the flag of the 1st Engineer Regiment)
 IV Mining Engineer Battalion, in Udine -> disbanded
 V Army Corps Engineer Battalion, in Udine ->  5th Engineer Battalion "Bolsena" (assigned the flag of the 5th Engineer Regiment)
 2nd Photoelectric Company, in Udine -> disbanded
 2nd Camouflage Company, in Udine -> disbanded
 V Artillery Specialists Group, in Cordenons ->  41st Artillery Specialists Group "Cordenons" (assigned the flag of the 41st Artillery Regiment "Firenze") --> in 1977 to 3rd Missile Brigade "Aquileia" and ʘ-> Casarsa della Delizia
 new:  5th Army Light Aviation Grouping "Rigel", at Casarsa Airport (granted a new flag)
 V Light Aviation Battalion, at Casarsa Airport (L-21B Super Cup) -> 25th Light Airplanes and Helicopters Squadrons Group "Cigno", in Casarsa della Delizia --> 5th Army Light Aviation Grouping "Rigel"
 V General Use Helicopters Battalion, at Casarsa Airport (AB 204/205 helicopters) -> 55th Multirole Helicopters Squadrons Group "Dragone", in Casarsa della Delizia --> 5th Army Light Aviation Grouping "Rigel"
 V Army Corps Signal Battalion, in Codroipo ->  5th Signal Battalion "Rolle" (assigned the flag of the 7th Engineer Regiment (Telegraphers)) ʘ-> Sacile
 V Army Corps Transport Group, in Treviso ->  5th Army Corps Transport Group "Postumia", in Treviso (granted a new flag)
 V Territorial Transport Group, in Montorio Veronese ->  14th Maneuver Transport Group "Flavia", in Montorio Veronese (granted a new flag)
 V Supply, Repairs, Recovery Battalion, in Pordenone
 XIII Mechanized Carabinieri Battalion "Friuli Venezia Giulia", in Gorizia -> 13th Carabinieri Battalion "M. O. Gallo" (granted a new flag)

Armored Division "Ariete" 

  Armored Division "Ariete", in Pordenone
 new: Command Unit "Ariete", in Pordenone
  8th Bersaglieri Regiment, in Pordenone ->  8th Mechanized Brigade "Garibaldi", in Pordenone
 Command and Services Company, in Pordenone (includes an anti-tank guided missile platoon) -> Command and Signal Unit "Garibaldi"
 III Bersaglieri Battalion, in Pordenone (M113 armored personnel carriers) ->  3rd Bersaglieri Battalion "Cernaia" (assigned the flag of the 8th Bersaglieri Regiment)
 VII Tank Battalion, in Vivaro (M60A1 Patton main battle tanks) ->  7th Tank Battalion "M.O. Di Dio" (granted a new flag)
 XII Bersaglieri Battalion, in Pordenone (M113 armored personnel carriers) ->  26th Bersaglieri Battalion "Castelfidardo" (assigned the flag of the 4th Bersaglieri Regiment)
 new: Anti-tank Company "Garibaldi", in Vivaro
 new: Engineer Company "Garibaldi", in Orcenico Superiore
  32nd Tank Regiment, in Tauriano ->  32nd Armored Brigade "Mameli"
 Command and Services Company, in Tauriano (includes an anti-tank guided missile platoon) -> Command and Signal Unit "Mameli"
 III Tank Battalion, in Tauriano (M60A1 Patton main battle tanks) ->  3rd Tank Battalion "M.O. Galas" (assigned the flag of the 32nd Tank Regiment)
 V Tank Battalion, in Tauriano (M60A1 Patton main battle tanks) ->  5th Tank Battalion "M.O. Chiamenti" (granted a new flag)
 XXIII Bersaglieri Battalion, in Tauriano (M113 armored personnel carriers) ->  23rd Bersaglieri Battalion "Castel di Borgo" (assigned the flag of the 12th Bersaglieri Regiment)
 new: Anti-tank Company "Mameli", in Vacile
 new: Engineer Company "Mameli", in Vacile
  132nd Tank Regiment, in Aviano ->  132nd Armored Brigade "Manin"
 Command and Services Company, in Aviano (includes an anti-tank guided missile platoon) -> Command and Signal Unit "Manin"
 VIII Tank Battalion, in Aviano (M60A1 Patton main battle tanks) ->  8th Tank Battalion "M.O. Secchiaroli" (assigned the flag of the 132nd Tank Regiment)
 X Tank Battalion, in Aviano (M60A1 Patton main battle tanks) ->  10th Tank Battalion "M.O. Bruno" (assigned the flag of the 133rd Tank Regiment)
 XXXVIII Bersaglieri Battalion, in Aviano (M113 armored personnel carriers) ->  27th Bersaglieri Battalion "Jamiano" (assigned the flag of the 11th Bersaglieri Regiment)
 new: Anti-tank Company "Manin", in Aviano
 new: Engineer Company "Manin", in Maniago
  132nd Armored Artillery Regiment, in Casarsa della Delizia -> Divisional Artillery Command
 Command and Services Battery, in Casarsa della Delizia -> Artillery Specialists Group "Ariete"
 I Self-propelled Field Artillery Group, in Vacile (M109G 155mm self-propelled howitzers) ->  12th Self-propelled Field Artillery Group "Capua" (assigned the flag of the 12th Artillery Regiment "Savona") --> 32nd Armored Brigade "Mameli"
 II Self-propelled Field Artillery Group, in Sequals (M109G 155mm self-propelled howitzers) ->  19th Self-propelled Field Artillery Group "Rialto" (assigned the flag of the 19th Artillery Regiment "Venezia") --> 8th Mechanized Brigade "Garibaldi"
 III Self-propelled Field Artillery Group, in Maniago (M109G 155mm self-propelled howitzers) ->  20th Self-propelled Field Artillery Group "Piave" (assigned the flag of the 20th Artillery Regiment "Piave") --> 132nd Armored Brigade "Manin"
 IV Heavy Self-propelled Field Artillery Group, in Casarsa della Delizia (M109G 155mm self-propelled howitzers) ->  132nd Heavy Self-propelled Field Artillery Group "Rovereto" (assigned the flag of the 132nd Armored Artillery Regiment "Ariete")
 V Heavy Self-propelled Artillery Group, in Casarsa della Delizia (M55 203mm self-propelled howitzers) ->  108th Heavy Self-propelled Field Artillery Group "Cosseria" (assigned the flag of the 108th Artillery Regiment "Cosseria") -> M109G 155mm self-propelled howitzers
 VI Light Anti-aircraft Artillery Group (Reserve), in Casarsa della Delizia (Bofors 40mm anti-aircraft guns and 12.7mm anti-aircraft machine guns) -> 14th Light Anti-aircraft Artillery Group "Astore" (Reserve)
 Artillery Specialists Battery, in Casarsa della Delizia -> Artillery Specialists Group "Ariete"
 Squadrons Group "Cavalleggeri Guide", in Casarsa della Delizia (Fiat Campagnola reconnaissance vehicles and M47 Patton tanks) ->  19th Squadrons Group "Cavalleggeri Guide" (assigned the flag of the Regiment "Cavalleggeri Guide" (19th))
 LXXIII Infantry Fortification Battalion "Lombardia", in Arzene and Latisana ->  73rd Infantry Fortification Battalion "Lombardia", in Arzene (assigned the flag of the 73rd Infantry Regiment "Lombardia") and 74th Infantry Fortification Battalion "Pontida" (Reserve), in Latisana (Unit would have been activated in case of war and would have been assigned the flag of the 74th Infantry Regiment "Lombardia")
 Light Aviation Unit "Ariete", at Casarsa Airport (L-19E Bird Dog light aircraft and AB 206 reconnaissance helicopters) -> 49th Reconnaissance Helicopters Squadrons Group "Capricorno"
 Engineer Battalion "Ariete", in Motta di Livenza ->  132nd Engineer Battalion "Livenza" (assigned the flag of the 11th Engineer Regiment)
 Signal Battalion "Ariete", in Casarsa della Delizia ->  232nd Signal Battalion "Fadalto" (granted a new flag)
 Services Grouping "Ariete", in Pordenone-> disbanded
 Command and Services Company, in Pordenone -> disbanded
 Supply, Repairs, Recovery Unit "Ariete", in Pordenone ->  Logistic Battalion "Ariete" (granted a new flag) ʘ-> Casarsa della Delizia
 Transport Unit "Ariete", in Pordenone -> disbanded
 I Services Battalion "Ariete", in Pordenone ->  Logistic Battalion "Garibaldi" (granted a new flag) --> 8th Mechanized Brigade "Garibaldi"
 II Services Battalion "Ariete", in Vacile ->  Logistic Battalion "Mameli" (granted a new flag) --> 32nd Armored Brigade "Mameli"
 III Services Battalion "Ariete", in Maniago ->  Logistic Battalion "Manin" (granted a new flag) --> 132nd Armored Brigade "Manin"
 new: Medical Battalion "Ariete" (Reserve), in Pordenone

Infantry Division "Folgore" 

  Infantry Division "Folgore", in Treviso ->  Mechanized Division "Folgore"
 new: Command Unit "Folgore", in Treviso
  53rd Infantry Fortification Regiment "Umbria", in Ialmicco -> disbanded
 Command and Services Company, in Ialmicco -> disbanded
 I Battalion, in Pavia di Udine and Brazzano ->  53rd Infantry Fortification Battalion "Umbria" (assigned the flag of the 53rd Infantry Regiment "Umbria")
 II Battalion, in San Lorenzo Isontino, Farra d'Isonzo, and Lucinico ->  63rd Infantry Fortification Battalion "Cagliari" (assigned the flag of the 63rd Infantry Regiment "Cagliari") --> Mechanized Brigade "Gorizia"
 III Battalion, in Fogliano Redipuglia and Perteole ->  33rd Infantry Fortification Battalion "Ardenza" (assigned the flag of the 33rd Infantry Regiment "Livorno") --> Mechanized Brigade "Gorizia"
  82nd Infantry Regiment "Torino", in Gorizia ->  Mechanized Brigade "Gorizia"
 Command and Services Company, in Gorizia -> Command and Signal Unit "Gorizia"
 I Infantry Battalion, in Trieste -> disbanded
 II Infantry Battalion, in Cormons ->  82nd Mechanized Infantry Battalion "Torino" (assigned the flag of the 82nd Infantry Regiment "Torino")
 III Infantry Battalion, in Gorizia -> disbanded
 IV Mechanized Battalion, in Gorizia (M113 armored personnel carriers and M47 tanks) -> disbanded
 Regimental Anti-tank Company, in Gorizia (anti-tank guided missiles and M47 tanks) -> Anti-tank Company "Gorizia"
 new: Engineer Company "Gorizia", in Cormons
 new:  Logistic Battalion "Gorizia", in Gradisca d'Isonzo (granted a new flag)
  182nd Armored Infantry Regiment "Garibaldi", in Sacile -> disbanded
 Command and Services Company, in Sacile (includes an anti-tank guided missile platoon) -> disbanded
 XI Bersaglieri Battalion, in Sacile (M113 armored personnel carriers) ->  11th Bersaglieri Battalion "Caprera" (assigned the flag of the 182nd Armored Infantry Regiment "Garibaldi") ʘ-> Orcenico Superiore --> 8th Mechanized Brigade "Garibaldi"
 XIII Tank Battalion, in Sacile (M47 Patton tanks) ->  13th Tank Battalion "M.O. Pascucci" (granted a new flag) ʘ-> Cordenons --> Mechanized Brigade "Brescia", and in 1977 -> Leopard 1A2 main battle tanks
  183rd Infantry Regiment "Nembo", in Cervignano del Friuli -> disbanded
 Command and Services Company, in Cervignano del Friuli -> disbanded
 I Infantry Battalion, in Villa Vicentina -> disbanded
 II Infantry Battalion, in Cervignano del Friuli -> disbanded
 III Infantry Battalion, in Gradisca d'Isonzo -> disbanded
 IV Mechanized Battalion, in Gradisca d'Isonzo (M113 armored personnel carriers and M47 tanks) ->  183rd Mechanized Infantry Battalion "Nembo" (assigned the flag of the 183rd Paratroopers Regiment "Nembo") --> Mechanized Brigade "Gorizia"
 Regimental Anti-tank Company, in Cervignano del Friuli (anti-tank guided missiles and M47 tanks) -> disbanded
  33rd Field Artillery Regiment, in Treviso -> Divisional Artillery Command
 Command and Services Battery, in Treviso -> Artillery Specialists Group "Folgore"
 I Field Artillery Group, in Gradisca d'Isonzo (M14/61 105mm towed howitzers) ->  46th Field Artillery Group "Trento" (assigned the flag of the 46th Artillery Regiment "Trento") -> M114 155mm towed howitzers --> Mechanized Brigade "Gorizia"
 II Field Artillery Group, in Gradisca d'Isonzo (M14/61 105mm towed howitzers) -> disbanded
 III Self-propelled Field Artillery Group, in Treviso (M7 105mm self-propelled howitzers) ->  33rd Heavy Self-propelled Field Artillery Group "Terni" (assigned the flag of the 33rd Artillery Regiment "Acqui") -> M109G 155mm self-propelled howitzers
 IV Heavy Field Artillery Group, in Treviso (M114 155mm towed howitzers) ->  184th Heavy Self-propelled Field Artillery Group "Filottrano" (assigned the flag of the 184th Artillery Regiment "Nembo") ʘ-> Padua
 V Light Anti-aircraft Artillery Group (Reserve), in Treviso (Bofors 40mm anti-aircraft guns and 12.7mm anti-aircraft machine guns) -> 13th Light Anti-aircraft Artillery Group "Condor" (Reserve)
 Artillery Specialists Battery, in Treviso -> Artillery Specialists Group "Folgore"
 Squadrons Group "Cavalleggeri di Saluzzo", in Gradisca d'Isonzo (Fiat Campagnola reconnaissance vehicles and M47 Patton tanks) ->  12th Squadrons Group "Cavalleggeri di Saluzzo" (assigned the flag of the Regiment "Cavalleggeri di Saluzzo" (12th)) ʘ-> Gorizia
 Light Aviation Unit "Folgore", at Treviso Airport (L-19E Bird Dog light aircraft and AB 206 reconnaissance helicopters) -> 47th Reconnaissance Helicopters Squadrons Group "Levrieri"
 Engineer Battalion "Folgore", in Villa Vicentina ->  184th Engineer Battalion "Santerno" (assigned the flag of the 8th Engineer Regiment)
 Signal Battalion "Folgore", in Treviso ->  184th Signal Battalion "Cansiglio" (granted a new flag)
 Services Grouping "Folgore", in Treviso ->  Logistic Battalion "Folgore" (granted a new flag)
 Command Platoon, in Treviso
 Supply, Repairs, Recovery Unit "Folgore", in Treviso -> disbanded
 Transport Unit "Folgore", in San Giorgio di Nogaro -> disbanded
 Medical Battalion "Folgore", in Treviso -> Medical Battalion "Folgore" (Reserve)
 Provisions Supply Company "Folgore", in Treviso -> disbanded

Infantry Division "Mantova" 

  Infantry Division "Mantova", in Udine ->  Mechanized Division "Mantova"
 new: Command Unit "Mantova", in Udine
  52nd Infantry Fortification Regiment "Alpi", in Tarcento -> disbanded
 Command and Services Company, in Tarcento -> disbanded
 I Battalion, in Tarcento, Attimis, and Grupignano ->  52nd Infantry Fortification Battalion "Alpi" (assigned the flag of the 52nd Infantry Regiment "Alpi") ʘ-> Attimis --> Mechanized Brigade "Isonzo"
 II Battalion (Reserve), in Tarcento -> disbanded
 III Battalion, in Ipplis and Purgessimo ->  120th Infantry Fortification Battalion "Fornovo" (assigned the flag of the 120th Infantry Regiment "Emilia") --> Mechanized Brigade "Isonzo"
  59th Infantry Regiment "Calabria", in Palmanova -> disbanded
 Command and Services Company, in Palmanova -> disbanded
 I Infantry Battalion, in Cormons -> disbanded
 II Infantry Battalion, in Cividale del Friuli ->  59th Mechanized Infantry Battalion "Calabria" (assigned the flag of the 59th Infantry Regiment "Calabria") --> Mechanized Brigade "Isonzo"
 III Infantry Battalion, in Palmanova -> disbanded
 Regimental Anti-tank Company, in (?) (anti-tank guided missiles and M47 tanks) -> disbanded
  76th Infantry Regiment "Napoli", in Cividale del Friuli ->  Mechanized Brigade "Isonzo"
 Command and Services Company, in Cividale del Friuli -> Command and Signal Unit "Isonzo"
 I Infantry Battalion, in Cividale del Friuli ->  76th Mechanized Infantry Battalion "Napoli" (assigned the flag of the 76th Infantry Regiment "Napoli")
 II Infantry Battalion, in Cividale del Friuli -> disbanded
 III Infantry Battalion, in Cividale del Friuli -> disbanded
 IV Mechanized Battalion, in Udine (M113 armored personnel carriers and M47 tanks) -> disbanded
 Regimental Anti-tank Company, in Cividale del Friuli (anti-tank guided missiles and M47 tanks) -> disbanded
 new: Engineer Company "Isonzo", in Tarcento
 new:  Logistic Battalion "Isonzo", in Tricesimo (granted a new flag)
  114th Infantry Regiment "Mantova", in Tricesimo -> disbanded
 Command and Services Company, in Tricesimo -> disbanded
 I Infantry Battalion, in Artegna ->  7th Infantry (Recruits Training) Battalion "Cuneo" (BAR) (assigned the flag of the 7th Infantry Regiment "Cuneo") --> 5th Army Corps ʘ-> Udine
 II Infantry Battalion, in Tarcento ->  114th Mechanized Infantry Battalion "Moriago" (assigned the flag of the 114th Infantry Regiment "Mantova") --> Mechanized Brigade "Isonzo", and in 1976 ʘ-> Tricesimo
 III Infantry Battalion, in Tricesimo -> disbanded
 IV Mechanized Battalion, in Tricesimo (M113 armored personnel carriers and M47 tanks) -> disbanded
 Regimental Anti-tank Company, in Tarcento (anti-tank guided missiles and M47 tanks) -> Anti-tank Company "Isonzo"
  5th Field Artillery Regiment, in Udine -> Divisional Artillery Command
 Command and Services Battery, in Udine -> Artillery Specialists Group "Mantova"
 I Field Artillery Group, in Palmanova (M14/61 105mm towed howitzers) -> disbanded
 II Field Artillery Group, in Udine (M14/61 105mm towed howitzers) ->  5th Heavy Self-propelled Field Artillery Group "Superga" (assigned the flag of the 5th Artillery Regiment "Superga") -> M109G 155mm self-propelled howitzers
 III Field Artillery Group, in Udine (M14/61 105mm towed howitzers) ->  155th Heavy Self-propelled Field Artillery Group "Emilia" (assigned the flag of the 155th Artillery Regiment "Emilia") -> M109G 155mm self-propelled howitzers
 IV Heavy Field Artillery Group, in Tricesimo (M114 155mm towed howitzers) ->  28th Field Artillery Group "Livorno" (assigned the flag of the 28th Artillery Regiment "Livorno") --> Mechanized Brigade "Isonzo"
 V Light Anti-aircraft Artillery Group (Reserve), in Udine (Bofors 40mm anti-aircraft guns and 12.7mm anti-aircraft machine guns) -> 12th Light Anti-aircraft Artillery Group "Nibbio" (Reserve)
 Artillery Specialists Battery, in Udine -> Artillery Specialists Group "Mantova"
 Squadrons Group "Lancieri di Aosta", in Cervignano del Friuli (Fiat Campagnola reconnaissance vehicles and M47 Patton tanks) ->  6th Tank Squadrons Group "Lancieri di Aosta" (assigned the flag of the Regiment "Lancieri di Aosta" (6th)) -> Leopard 1A2 main battle tanks --> Armored Brigade "Vittorio Veneto"
 LXIII Tank Battalion, in Cordenons (M47 Patton tanks) ->  63rd Tank Battalion "M.O. Fioritto" (granted a new flag) -> Leopard 1A2 main battle tanks --> Mechanized Brigade "Isonzo"
 Light Aviation Unit "Mantova", at Campoformido Airport (L-19E Bird Dog light aircraft and AB 206 reconnaissance helicopters) -> 48th Reconnaissance Helicopters Squadrons Group "Pavone"
 Engineer Battalion "Mantova", in Orzano di Remanzacco ->  104th Engineer Battalion "Torre" (assigned the flag of the 7th Engineer Regiment)
 Signal Battalion "Mantova", in Udine ->  107th Signal Battalion "Predil" (granted a new flag)
 Services Grouping "Mantova", in Udine ->  Logistic Battalion "Mantova" (granted a new flag)
 Command Platoon, in Udine
 Supply, Repairs, Recovery Unit "Mantova", in Udine -> disbanded
 Transport Unit "Mantova", in Orzano di Remanzacco -> disbanded
 Medical Battalion "Mantova", in Udine -> Medical Battalion "Mantova" (Reserve)
 Provisions Supply Company "Mantova", in Udine -> disbanded

Cavalry Brigade "Pozzuolo del Friuli" 

  Cavalry Brigade "Pozzuolo del Friuli", in Gorizia ->  Armored Brigade "Pozzuolo del Friuli" ʘ-> Palmanova --> Mechanized Division "Mantova"
  Regiment "Piemonte Cavalleria" (2nd), in Villa Opicina ->  Armored Brigade "Vittorio Veneto" --> Mechanized Division "Folgore"
 Command and Services Squadron, in Villa Opicina -> Command and Signal Unit "Vittorio Veneto"
 I Squadrons Group, in Villa Opicina (Leopard 1A2 main battle tanks and M113 APCs) ->  2nd Mechanized Squadrons Group "Piemonte Cavalleria" (assigned the flag of the Regiment "Piemonte Cavalleria" (2nd)) -> M113 APCs --> Armored Brigade "Vittorio Veneto"
 II Squadrons Group, in Sgonico (Leopard 1A2 main battle tanks and M113 APCs) ->  9th Tank Squadrons Group "Lancieri di Firenze" (assigned the flag of the Regiment "Lancieri di Firenze" (9th)) -> Leopard 1A2 main battle tanks --> Armored Brigade "Vittorio Veneto"
 III Squadrons Group, in Trieste (Leopard 1A2 main battle tanks and M113 APCs) -> disbanded
 new: Anti-tank Squadron "Vittorio Veneto", in Banne
 new: Engineer Company "Vittorio Veneto", in Cervignano del Friuli
  Regiment "Genova Cavalleria" (4th), in Palmanova -> disbanded
 Command and Services Squadron, in Palmanova -> disbanded
 I Squadrons Group, in Palmanova (Leopard 1A2 main battle tanks and M113 APCs) ->  4th Mechanized Squadrons Group "Genova Cavalleria" (assigned the flag of the Regiment "Genova Cavalleria" (4th)) -> M113 APCs
 II Squadrons Group, in Palmanova (Leopard 1A2 main battle tanks and M113 APCs) ->  28th Tank Squadrons Group "Cavalleggeri di Treviso" (assigned the flag of the Regiment "Cavalleggeri di Treviso" (28th)) -> Leopard 1A2 main battle tanks
 III Squadrons Group, in Palmanova (Leopard 1A2 main battle tanks and M113 APCs) -> disbanded
  8th Self-propelled Field Artillery Regiment, in Palmanova -> disbanded
 Command and Services Battery, in Palmanova -> disbanded
 I Self-propelled Field Artillery Group, in Palmanova (M109G 155mm self-propelled howitzers) ->  120th Self-propelled Field Artillery Group "Po" (assigned the flag of the 120th Motorized Artillery Regiment)
 II Self-propelled Field Artillery Group, in Banne (M109G 155mm self-propelled howitzers) -> disbanded
 III Self-propelled Field Artillery Group, in Banne (M109G 155mm self-propelled howitzers) ->  8th Self-propelled Field Artillery Group "Pasubio" (assigned the flag of the 8th Artillery Regiment "Pasubio") --> Armored Brigade "Vittorio Veneto"
 Squadrons Group "Lancieri di Novara", in Codroipo (Leopard 1A2 main battle tanks) ->  5th Tank Squadrons Group "Lancieri di Novara" (assigned the flag of the Regiment "Lancieri di Novara" (5th))
 Light Aviation Unit "Pozzuolo del Friuli", in Campoformido (L-19E Bird Dog) -> disbanded
 new: Anti-tank Squadron "Pozzuolo del Friuli", in Palmanova
 Engineer Company "Pozzuolo del Friuli", in Palmanova
 Signal Company "Pozzuolo del Friuli", in Gorizia -> Command and Signal Unit "Pozzuolo del Friuli" ʘ-> Palmanova
 new:  Logistic Battalion "Pozzuolo del Friuli", in Visco (granted a new flag)
 Services Grouping "Pozzuolo del Friuli", in Cervignano del Friuli ->  Logistic Battalion "Vittorio Veneto" (granted a new flag) --> Armored Brigade "Vittorio Veneto"
 Command Platoon, in Cervignano del Friuli
 Supply, Repairs, Recovery Unit "Pozzuolo del Friuli", in Cervignano del Friuli -> disbanded
 Medical Battalion "Pozzuolo del Friuli", in Cervignano del Friuli -> disbanded
 Transport Unit "Pozzuolo del Friuli", in Cervignano del Friuli -> disbanded
 Provisions Supply Company "Pozzuolo del Friuli", in Cervignano del Friuli -> disbanded

III Missile Brigade 

  III Missile Brigade, in Portogruaro ->  3rd Missile Brigade "Aquileia"
 new: Command Unit "Aquileia", in Portogruaro
  3rd Missile Artillery Regiment, in Portogruaro -> disbanded
 Command and Services Battery, in Portogruaro -> disbanded
 I Missile Artillery Group, in Codogné (MGR-1 Honest John surface-to-surface missiles) (already disbanded 31 July 1973)
 II Missile Artillery Group, in Portogruaro (MGR-1 Honest John surface-to-surface missiles) -> disbanded
 III Missile Artillery Group, in Oderzo (MGR-1 Honest John surface-to-surface missiles) ->  3rd Missile Group "Volturno" (assigned the flag of the 3rd Army Artillery Regiment) -> MGM-52 Lance
 IV Missile Artillery Group, in Elvas (MGR-1 Honest John surface-to-surface missiles) (already disbanded 31 July 1973)
 1st Fusiliers Company, in Codogné
 2nd Fusiliers Company, in Portogruaro ʘ-> Vicenza --> 3rd Missile Brigade "Aquileia"
 3rd Fusiliers Company, in Oderzo
 4th Fusiliers Company, in Elvas --> 1st Heavy Artillery Group "Adige"
 XIII Reconnaissance and Target Acquisition Group (GRACO), in Verona -> 13th Target Acquisition Group "Aquileia"
 Command and Services Battery
 Reconnaissance and Target Acquisition Battery
 Unmanned Aircraft Battery (MQM-57 "Falconer" drones) -> Canadair CL-89B "Midge" drones
 III Missile Brigade Light Aviation Unit, at Boscomantico Airport -> Air Component --> 13th Target Acquisition Group "Aquileia"
 Light Airplanes Section (L-19E Bird Dog) -> 398th Light Airplanes Squadron -> SM.1019A planes
 General Use Helicopters Section (AB-204B helicopters) -> 598th Multirole Helicopters Squadron
 Maintenance Section -> Light Airplanes Maintenance Squadron
 XIII Signal Battalion, in Portogruaro ->  13th Signal Battalion "Mauria" (granted a new flag)
 XIII Supply and Repairs Battalion, in Vicenza
 XIV Heavy Artillery Group, in Trento (M115 203mm towed howitzers) ->  1st Heavy Artillery Group "Adige" (assigned the flag of the 1st Army Artillery Regiment) ʘ-> Elvas
 XV Heavy Artillery Group, in Verona (M115 203mm towed howitzers) ->  9th Heavy Artillery Group "Rovigo" (assigned the flag of the 9th Army Artillery Regiment)
 XXI Engineer Battalion, in Vicenza ->  21st Engineer Battalion "Timavo" (assigned the flag of the 21st Engineer Regiment)
 new:  92nd Infantry (Recruits Training) Battalion "Basilicata" (BAR), in Portogruaro (assigned the flag of the 92nd Infantry Regiment "Basilicata")

Trieste Troops Command 

  Trieste Troops Command, in Trieste
 new: Command and Services Platoon, in Trieste
  151st Infantry Regiment "Sassari", in Trieste -> disbanded, flag and traditions transferred to the II Battalion of the 152nd Infantry Regiment "Sassari"
 Command and Services Company, in Trieste -> disbanded
 I Infantry Battalion, in Trieste ->  1st Motorized Infantry Battalion "San Giusto" (assigned the flag of the 1st Infantry Regiment "Re")
 II Infantry Battalion, in Trieste -> disbanded and equipment stored (In case of war would have been activated as 43rd Motorized Infantry Battalion "Forlì" and would have been assigned the flag of the 43rd Infantry Regiment "Forlì")
 III Infantry Battalion, in Trieste -> disbanded and equipment stored (In case of war would have been activated as 255th Motorized Infantry Battalion "Veneto" and would have been assigned the flag of the 255th Infantry Regiment "Veneto")
 Regimental Anti-tank Company, in Trieste (anti-tank guided missiles and M47 tanks) -> disbanded
  14th Field Artillery Regiment, in Trieste -> disbanded
 Command and Services Battery, in Trieste -> disbanded
 I Field Artillery Group, in Trieste (M14/61 105mm towed howitzers) ->  14th Field Artillery Group "Murge" (assigned the flag of the 14th Artillery Regiment "Murge") -> M114 155mm towed howitzers
 II Field Artillery Group, in Muggia (M14/61 105mm towed howitzers) -> disbanded
 Engineer Platoon, in Trieste
 Signal Platoon, in Trieste
 Light Airplanes Section, at Trieste-Prosecco Heliport -> 554th Multirole Helicopters Squadron / 55th Multirole Helicopters Squadrons Group "Dragone" / 5th Army Light Aviation Grouping "Rigel"
 Services Squad, in Trieste -> Provisions Supply Platoon
 Carabinieri Squad, in Trieste

Northwestern Military Region - I C.M.T. 

 Northwestern Military Region - I C.M.T., in Turin (Regione Militare Nord Ovest (R.M.N.O.): Aosta, Liguria (minus La Spezia province), Lombardy (minus Brescia and Mantua provinces), and Piedmont regions)
 new: R.M.N.O. Command Unit, in Turin
  11th Infantry Regiment "Casale" (CAR), in Casale Monferrato -> disbanded
 Command and Services Company, in Casale Monferrato -> disbanded
 I Battalion, in Casale Monferrato ->  11th Infantry (Recruits Training) Battalion "Casale" (BAR) (assigned the flag of the 11th Infantry Regiment "Casale") --> Mechanized Division "Mantova"
 II Battalion, in Casale Monferrato -> disbanded
 III Battalion, in Casale Monferrato -> disbanded
  89th Infantry Regiment "Salerno" (CAR), in Imperia -> disbanded, name, flag, and traditions transferred to the II Armored Troops Recruits Training Battalion of the Southern Military Region
 Command and Services Company, in Imperia -> disbanded
 I Battalion, in Albenga -> Detachment 26th Infantry (Recruits Training) Battalion "Bergamo" (BAR); in 1977 ->  72nd Infantry (Recruits Training) Battalion "Puglie" (BAR) (assigned the flag of the 72nd Infantry Regiment "Puglie") --> Armored Division "Centauro"
 II Battalion, in Savona ->  16th Infantry (Recruits Training) Battalion "Savona" (BAR) (assigned the flag of the 16th Infantry Regiment "Savona") --> Armored Division "Ariete"
 III Battalion, in Imperia -> disbanded
 IV Battalion, in Albenga -> Detachment 16th Infantry (Recruits Training) Battalion "Savona" (BAR); in 1977 ->  14th Bersaglieri (Recruits Training) Battalion "Sernaglia" (BAR) (assigned the flag of the 5th Bersaglieri Regiment) --> Armored Division "Ariete"
 Recruits Training Battalion "Como", in Como -> disbanded
 XLI Signal Battalion, in Turin ->  41st Signal Battalion "Frejus" (granted a new flag)
 1st Supply Unit, in Alessandria
 1st Mixed Transport Unit, in Turin -> 1st Mixed Maneuver Transport Unit
 1st Army Repairs Workshop Type B, in Turin
 3rd Army Repairs Workshop Type A, in Milan
 1st Provisions Supply Company, in Turin
 1st Medical Company, in Milan
 Main Military Hospital, in Milan
 Military Hospital Type A, in Turin
 Military Hospital Type B, in Genoa
 Military Hospital Type B, in Brescia

Northeastern Military Region - V C.M.T. 

 Northeastern Military Region - V C.M.T., in Padua (Regione Militare Nord Est (R.M.N.E.): Friuli-Venezia Giulia, Trentino-Alto Adige, and Veneto regions and the two Lombardy provinces Brescia and Mantova)
 new: R.M.N.E. Command Unit, in Padua
 XXXI Signal Battalion, in Padua -> disbanded
 XXXII Signal Battalion, in Padua ->  32nd Signal Battalion "Valles" (granted a new flag) --> 5th Army Corps
 XLII Signal Battalion, in Padua ->  42nd Signal Battalion "Pordoi" (granted a new flag)
 Mixed Electronic Warfare Company, in Conegliano ->  33rd Electronic Warfare Battalion "Falzarego" (granted a new flag); 1 March 1979: --> 5th Army Corps
 4th Supply Unit, in Verona
 5th Supply Unit, in Mestre
 4th Repairs Workshop Type A, in Verona
 5th Repairs Workshop Type A, in Dosson
 15th Repairs Workshop Type A, in Padua
 4th Provisions Supply Company, in Verona
 5th Provisions Supply Company, in Padua
 4th Medical Company, in Verona
 5th Medical Company, in Udine
 Military Hospital Type A, in Verona
 Military Hospital Type A, in Padua
 Military Hospital Type A, in Udine
 Military Hospital Type B, in Bolzano

Tuscan-Emilian Military Region - VII C.M.T. 
 Tuscan-Emilian Military Region - VII C.M.T., in Florence (Regione Militare Tosco-Emiliana (R.M.T.E.): Emilia-Romagna and Tuscany regions, the Liguria province La Spezia, and the two Marche provinces Ancona and Pesaro-Urbino)
 new: R.M.T.E. Command Unit, in Florence
  28th Infantry Regiment "Pavia" (CAR), in Pesaro -> disbanded
 Command and Services Company, in Pesaro -> disbanded
 I Battalion, in Pesaro ->  28th Infantry (Recruits Training) Battalion "Pavia" (BAR) (assigned the flag of the 28th Infantry Regiment "Pavia") --> Mechanized Division "Folgore"
 II Battalion, in Fano -> disbanded
 III Battalion, in Falconara Marittima -> disbanded
  84th Infantry Regiment "Venezia" (CAR), in Siena -> disbanded
 Command and Services Company, in Siena -> disbanded
 I Battalion, in Siena ->  84th Infantry (Recruits Training) Battalion "Venezia" (BAR) (assigned the flag of the 84th Infantry Regiment "Venezia") --> Central Military Region; in 1977: ʘ-> Falconara Marittima
 II Battalion, in Pistoia -> disbanded
 III Battalion, in Arezzo ->  225th Infantry (Recruits Training) Battalion "Arezzo" (BAR) (assigned the flag of the 225th Infantry Regiment "Arezzo") --> Motorized Brigade "Friuli"
  3rd Heavy Field Artillery Regiment, in Pisa -> disbanded, flag and traditions transferred to the 4th Artillery Specialists Group "Bondone"
 Command and Services Battery, in Pisa -> disbanded
 I 155/23 Howitzers Group, in Pisa (M114 155mm towed howitzers) -> disbanded
 II 155/23 Howitzers Group, in Pisa (M114 155mm towed howitzers) -> disbanded
 III 155/23 Howitzers Group (Reserve), in Lucca (M114 155mm towed howitzers) -> disbanded
 IV 155/23 Howitzers Group, in Lucca (M114 155mm towed howitzers) -> disbanded
 3rd Artillery Specialists Battery, in Pisa -> disbanded
  8th Heavy Field Artillery Regiment, in Modena (flag of the 8th Army Corps Artillery Regiment)
 Command and Services Battery, in Modena
 I 155/45 Cannons Group, in Modena (M59 155mm towed howitzers) -> IV 155/45 Cannons Group / 8th Heavy Field Artillery Regiment
 II 155/23 Howitzers Group, in Ferrara (M114 155mm towed howitzers)
 III 155/23 Howitzers Group (Reserve), in Modena (M114 155mm towed howitzers)
 IV 155/23 Howitzers Group, in Piacenza (M114 155mm towed howitzers) (former II 155/23 Howitzers Group / 6th Heavy Field Artillery Regiment, transferred in 1974) -> I 155/23 Howitzers Group / 8th Heavy Field Artillery Regiment
 V 155/45 Cannons Group (Reserve), in Piacenza (M59 155mm towed howitzers) (former I 155/23 Howitzers Group / 6th Heavy Field Artillery Regiment, transferred and switched to M59 155mm towed howitzers in 1974)
 8th Artillery Specialists Battery, in Modena -> disbanded
  2nd Pontieri Engineer Regiment, in Piacenza --> Engineering Inspectorate
 Command and Services Company, in Piacenza -> Command and Services Platoon
 I Pontieri Battalion (Reserve), in Piacenza -> II Pontieri Engineer Battalion (Reserve)
 II Pontieri Battalion, in Legnago -> I Pontieri Engineer Battalion 
 III Pontieri Battalion, in Piacenza
  Ferrovieri Engineer Regiment, in Castel Maggiore --> Engineering Inspectorate
 Command and Services Company, in Castel Maggiore -> Command and Services Platoon
 I Ferrovieri Battalion (Metal Bridges), in Castel Maggiore
 II Ferrovieri Battalion (Operations), in Turin (operated the Chivasso–Ivrea–Aosta railway)
 VI Army Corps Engineer Battalion, in Bologna -> disbanded
 XLIII Signal Battalion, in Florence ->  43rd Signal Battalion "Abetone" (granted a new flag)
 7th Supply Unit, in Sesto Fiorentino
 7th Mixed Transport Unit, in Coverciano -> 7th Mixed Maneuver Transport Unit
 2nd Light Army Aviation Repairs Unit, at Borgo Panigale Airport --> Army Logistic Inspectorate
 6th Army Repairs Workshop Type B, in Bologna
 7th Army Repairs Workshop Type A, in Coverciano
 7th Provisions Supply Company, in Florence
 7th Medical Company, in Florence
 Military Hospital Type A, in Bologna
 Military Hospital Type A, in Florence
 Military Hospital Type B, in Livorno
 Military Hospital Type B, in Piacenza

Infantry Brigade "Trieste" 
  Infantry Brigade "Trieste", in Bologna ->  Mechanized Brigade "Trieste" --> Mechanized Division "Folgore"
  40th Infantry Regiment "Bologna", in Bologna -> disbanded
 Command and Services Company, in Bologna -> Command and Signal Unit "Trieste"
 I Infantry Battalion, in Bologna ->  40th Mechanized Infantry Battalion "Bologna" (assigned the flag of the 40th Infantry Regiment "Bologna")
 II Infantry Battalion, in Forlì ->  66th Mechanized Infantry Battalion "Valtellina" (assigned the flag of the 66th Infantry Regiment "Valtellina")
 III Infantry Battalion, in Bologna ->  37th Mechanized Infantry Battalion "Ravenna" (assigned the flag of the 37th Infantry Regiment "Ravenna")
 Regimental Anti-tank Company, in Bologna (anti-tank guided missiles and M47 tanks) -> Anti-tank Company "Trieste"
 XI Armored Battalion, in Ozzano dell'Emilia (M47 Patton tanks and M113 APCs) ->  11th Tank Battalion "M.O. Calzecchi" (granted a new flag); in 1977: -> Leopard 1A2 main battle tanks
 Field Artillery Group "Trieste", in Bologna (M14/61 105mm towed howitzers) ->  21st Field Artillery Group "Romagna" (assigned the flag of the 21st Artillery Regiment "Trieste") -> M114 155mm towed howitzers
 Light Aviation Unit "Trieste", at Borgo Panigale Airport (L-21B Super Cup) -> 271st Light Airplanes Squadron / 27th Light Airplanes and Helicopters Squadrons Group "Mercurio" / Tuscan-Emilian Military Region
 Engineer Company "Trieste", in Bologna
 Signal Company "Trieste", in Bologna --> Command and Signal Unit "Trieste"
 Supply, Repairs, Recovery Unit "Trieste", in Budrio ->  Logistic Battalion "Trieste" (granted a new flag)
 Transport Unit "Trieste", in Budrio --> Logistic Battalion "Trieste"

Infantry Brigade "Friuli" 
  Infantry Brigade "Friuli", in Florence ->  Motorized Brigade "Friuli"
  78th Infantry Regiment "Lupi di Toscana", in Scandicci -> disbanded
 Command and Services Company, in Scandicci -> Command and Signal Unit "Friuli"
 I Infantry Battalion, in Scandicci ->  78th Motorized Infantry Battalion "Lupi di Toscana" (assigned the flag of the 78th Infantry Regiment "Lupi di Toscana")
 II Infantry Battalion, in Pistoia ->  87th Motorized Infantry Battalion "Senio" (assigned the flag of the 87th Infantry Regiment "Friuli")
 III Infantry Battalion, in Scandicci -> disbanded and equipment stored (In case of war would have been activated as 35th Motorized Infantry Battalion "Pistoia" and would have been assigned the flag of the 35th Infantry Regiment "Pistoia")
 Regimental Anti-tank Company, in Scandicci (anti-tank guided missiles and M47 tanks) -> Anti-tank Company "Friuli"
 XIX Armored Battalion, in Florence (M47 Patton tanks and M113 APCs) ->  19th Armored Battalion "M.O. Tumiati" (granted a new flag)
 Field Artillery Group "Friuli", in Pistoia (M14/61 105mm towed howitzers) ->  35th Field Artillery Group "Riolo" (assigned the flag of the 35th Artillery Regiment "Friuli") -> M114 155mm towed howitzers
 Light Aviation Unit "Friuli", at Peretola Airport (L-21B Super Cup) -> 27th Light Airplanes and Helicopters Squadrons Group "Mercurio" --> Tuscan-Emilian Military Region
 Engineer Company "Friuli", in Florence
 Signal Company "Friuli", in Florence --> Command and Signal Unit "Friuli"
 Supply, Repairs, Recovery Unit "Friuli", in Coverciano ->  Logistic Battalion "Friuli" (granted a new flag)
 Transport Unit "Friuli", in Coverciano --> Logistic Battalion "Friuli"

Paratroopers Brigade "Folgore" 
  Paratroopers Brigade "Folgore", in Livorno
  1st Paratroopers Regiment, in Livorno -> disbanded
 Command and Services Company, in Livorno -> Paratroopers Command and Signal Unit "Folgore"
 II Paratroopers Battalion, in Pisa ->  2nd Paratroopers Battalion "Tarquinia" (assigned the flag of the 187th Paratroopers Regiment "Folgore") ʘ-> Livorno
 V Paratroopers Battalion, in Pisa ->  5th Paratroopers Battalion "El Alamein" (assigned the flag of the 186th Paratroopers Regiment "Folgore") ʘ-> Livorno
 120mm Mortar Company, in Livorno -> disbanded
 Saboteur Paratroopers Battalion, in Pisa ->  9th Paratroopers Assault Battalion "Col Moschin" (assigned the flag of the 10th Arditi Regiment)
 Carabinieri Paratroopers Battalion, in Livorno -> 1st Carabinieri Paratroopers Battalion "Tuscania" (granted a new flag)
 Paratroopers Field Artillery Group, in Livorno (M56 105mm towed howitzers) ->  185th Paratroopers Field Artillery Group "Viterbo" (assigned the flag of the 185th Artillery Regiment "Folgore")
 Light Aviation Unit "Folgore", at Pisa-San Giusto Air Base -> 26th Light Airplanes and Helicopters Squadrons Group "Giove"
 Paratroopers Pathfinder Company "Folgore", in Siena
 Paratroopers Engineer Company "Folgore", in Livorno ʘ-> Lucca
 Paratroopers Signal Company "Folgore", in Livorno --> Paratroopers Command and Signal Unit "Folgore"
 Air-supplies Company "Folgore", in Pisa ->  Paratroopers Logistic Battalion "Folgore" (granted a new flag)
 Maintenance Company "Folgore", in Livorno --> Paratroopers Logistic Battalion "Folgore"
 new: Paratroopers Anti-tank Company "Folgore", in Livorno

Central Military Region - VIII C.M.T. 
 Central Military Region - VIII C.M.T., in Rome (Regione Militare Centrale (R.M.C.): Abruzzo, Lazio, Marche (minus Ancona and Pesaro provinces) Sardinia, and Umbria regions)
 new: R.M.C. Command Unit, in Rome
  80th Infantry Regiment "Roma" (CAR), in Orvieto -> disbanded
 Command and Services Company, in Orvieto -> disbanded
 I Battalion, in Sora ->  57th Motorized Infantry Battalion "Abruzzi" (assigned the flag of the 57th Infantry Regiment "Abruzzi") --> Motorized Brigade "Acqui"
 II Battalion, in Orvieto ->  3rd Granatieri (Recruits Training) Battalion "Guardie" (BAR) (assigned the flag of the 3rd Regiment "Granatieri di Sardegna") --> Mechanized Brigade "Granatieri di Sardegna"
 III Battalion, in Cassino ->  80th Infantry (Recruits Training) Battalion "Roma" (BAR) (assigned the flag of the 80th Infantry Regiment "Roma")
  Regiment "Lancieri di Montebello" (8th), in Rome -> disbanded
 Command and Services Squadron, in Rome -> disbanded
 I Squadrons Group, in Rome (M47 Patton tanks and M113 APCs) ->  8th Armored Squadrons Group "Lancieri di Montebello" (assigned the flag of the Regiment "Lancieri di Montebello" (8th))
 II Squadrons Group, in Rome (M47 Patton tanks and M113 APCs) -> disbanded
 III Squadrons Group, in Rome (M47 Patton tanks and M113 APCs) -> disbanded
 Recruits Training Battalion "Chieti", in Chieti -> Detachment 235th Infantry (Recruits Training) Battalion "Piceno" (BAR); in 1985 ->  123rd Infantry (Recruits Training) Battalion "Chieti" (BAR) (assigned the flag of the 123rd Infantry Regiment "Chieti")
 XLIV Signal Battalion, in Rome ->  44th Signal Battalion "Penne" (granted a new flag)
 8th Supply Unit, in Rome
 8th Mixed Transport Unit, in Rome -> 8th Mixed Maneuver Transport Unit
 1st Light Army Aviation Repairs Unit, at Bracciano Airport --> Army Logistic Inspectorate
 8th Army Repairs Workshop Type A, in Rome
 8th Provisions Supply Company, in Rome
 8th Medical Company, in Rome
 Main Military Hospital, in Rome
 Military Hospital Type B, in Chieti
 Military Hospital Type B, in Perugia
 Military Hospital Type B, in Anzio

Infantry Division "Granatieri di Sardegna" 

  Infantry Division "Granatieri di Sardegna", in Rome ->  Mechanized Brigade "Granatieri di Sardegna"
  1st Regiment "Granatieri di Sardegna", in Rome -> disbanded
 Command and Services Company, in Rome -> Command and Signal Unit "Granatieri di Sardegna"
 I Granatieri Battalion, in Rome ->  1st Mechanized Granatieri Battalion "Assietta" (assigned the flag of the 1st Regiment "Granatieri di Sardegna")
 II Granatieri Battalion, in Rome ->  2nd Mechanized Granatieri Battalion "Cengio" (assigned the flag of the 2nd Regiment "Granatieri di Sardegna")
 III Granatieri Battalion, in Rome -> disbanded
 IV Mechanized Battalion, in Civitavecchia (M113 armored personnel carriers and M47 tanks) -> disbanded
 32nd Granatieri Anti-tank Company, in Civitavecchia (anti-tank guided missiles and M47 tanks)
  3rd Armored Infantry Regiment, in Persano -> disbanded, flag and traditions transferred to the IV Mechanized Battalion of the 17th Infantry Regiment "Acqui"
 Command and Services Company, in Persano (includes an anti-tank guided missile platoon) -> disbanded
 IV Bersaglieri Battalion, in Persano (M113 APCs) ->  67th Bersaglieri Battalion "Fagare" (assigned the flag of the 18th Bersaglieri Regiment) --> Motorized Brigade "Pinerolo"
 IX Tank Battalion, in Salerno (M47 Patton tanks) -> disbanded
 Squadron "Cavalleggeri di Alessandria", in Persano -> 14th Reconnaissance Squadron "Cavalleggeri di Alessandria" ʘ-> Civitavecchia --> Mechanized Brigade "Granatieri di Sardegna"
  17th Infantry Regiment "Acqui", in Sulmona ->  Motorized Brigade "Acqui" ʘ-> L'Aquila
 Command and Services Company, in Sulmona -> Command and Signal Unit "Acqui" ʘ-> L'Aquila
 I Infantry Battalion, in Sulmona ->  17th Infantry (Recruits Training) Battalion "San Martino" (BAR) (assigned the flag of the 17th Infantry Regiment "Acqui")
 II Infantry Battalion, in Spoleto ->  130th Motorized Infantry Battalion "Perugia" (assigned the flag of the 130th Infantry Regiment "Perugia")
 III Infantry Battalion, in Cesano -> disbanded and equipment stored (In case of war would have been activated as 70th Motorized Infantry Battalion "Ancona" and would have been assigned the flag of the 70th Infantry Regiment "Ancona")
 IV Mechanized Battalion, in L'Aquila (M113 armored personnel carriers and M47 tanks) ->  9th Armored Battalion "M.O. Butera" (assigned the flag of the 3rd Armored Infantry Regiment)
 Regimental Anti-tank Company, in Sulmona (anti-tank guided missiles and M47 tanks) -> Anti-tank Company "Acqui" ʘ-> L'Aquila
  13th Field Artillery Regiment, in L'Aquila -> disbanded, flag and traditions transferred to the II Self-propelled Field Artillery Group of the 131st Armored Artillery Regiment
 Command and Services Battery, in L'Aquila -> disbanded
 I Field Artillery Group, in Bracciano (M14/61 105mm towed howitzers) ->  18th Field Artillery Group "Gran Sasso" (assigned the flag of the 18th Artillery Regiment "Pinerolo") --> Artillery School
 II Field Artillery Group, in L'Aquila (M14/61 105mm towed howitzers) -> disbanded
 III Self-propelled Field Artillery Group, in L'Aquila (M7 105mm self-propelled howitzers) -> disbanded
 IV Heavy Field Artillery Group, in L'Aquila (M114 155mm towed howitzers) ->  48th Field Artillery Group "Taro" (assigned the flag of the 48th Artillery Regiment "Taro") --> Motorized Brigade "Acqui"
 V Light Anti-aircraft Artillery Group (Reserve), in (?) (Bofors 40mm anti-aircraft guns and 12.7mm anti-aircraft machine guns) -> disbanded
 Artillery Specialists Battery, in L'Aquila -> disbanded
 Light Aviation Unit "Granatieri di Sardegna", at Urbe Airport (L-19E Bird Dog light aircraft and AB 206 reconnaissance helicopters) -> 28th Light Airplanes and Helicopters Squadrons Group "Tucano" --> Central Military Region
 Engineer Battalion "Granatieri di Sardegna", in Rome ->  6th Engineer Battalion "Trasimeno" (assigned the flag of the 6th Engineer Regiment) --> Central Military Region
 Signal Battalion "Granatieri di Sardegna", in Rome -> disbanded, 1x company --> Command and Signal Unit "Granatieri di Sardegna" and 1x company --> Command and Signal Unit "Acqui"
 Services Grouping "Granatieri di Sardegna", in Civitavecchia -> disbanded
 Command Platoon, in Civitavecchia -> disbanded
 Supply, Repairs, Recovery Unit "Granatieri di Sardegna", in L'Aquila ->  Logistic Battalion "Acqui" (granted a new flag) --> Motorized Brigade "Acqui"
 Transport Unit "Granatieri di Sardegna", in L'Aquila -> disbanded
 Medical Battalion "Granatieri di Sardegna", in L'Aquila -> disbanded
 Provisions Supply Company "Granatieri di Sardegna", in L'Aquila -> disbanded

Sardinia Military Command 
 Sardinia Military Command, in Cagliari (Comando Militare della Sardegna - C.M.S.: Sardinia region)
 new: C.M.S. Command Unit, in Cagliari
  152nd Infantry Regiment "Sassari" (CAR), in Sassari -> disbanded
 Command and Services Company, in Sassari -> disbanded
 I Battalion, in Sassari ->  152nd Infantry (Recruits Training) Battalion "Sassari" (BAR) (assigned the flag of the 152nd Infantry Regiment "Sassari")
 II Battalion, in Cagliari ->  151st Infantry (Recruits Training) Battalion "Sette Comuni" (BAR) (assigned the flag of the 151st Infantry Regiment "Sassari")
 III Battalion, in Macomer -> Detachment 151st Infantry (Recruits Training) Battalion "Sette Comuni" (BAR); in 1977 ->  45th Infantry (Recruits Training) Battalion "Arborea" (BAR) (assigned the flag of the 45th Infantry Regiment "Reggio")
 Armored Units Training Ground, in Teulada ->  1st Armored Infantry Regiment (assigned the flag of the 1st Tank Infantry Regiment)
 Command and Services Company, in Teulada
 I Armored Battalion, in Teulada -> 1st Armored Battalion
 II Armored Battalion (Reserve), in Teulada -> 2nd Armored Battalion (Reserve)
 Transport Unit, in Teulada -> Logistic Unit
 Special Medium Workshop, in Teulada --> Logistic Unit
 General Use Helicopters Section, in Teulada -> 421st Reconnaissance Helicopters Squadron / 21st Light Airplanes and Helicopters Squadrons Group "Orsa Maggiore"
 new: 170th Self-propelled Field Artillery Group (Reserve), in Teulada
 C.M.S. Light Aviation Unit, at Elmas Airport (L-21B Super Cup) -> 21st Light Airplanes and Helicopters Squadrons Group "Orsa Maggiore"
 12th Supply Unit, in Nuoro
 12th Mixed Transport Unit, in Cagliari -> 12th Mixed Maneuver Transport Unit
 12th Army Repairs Workshop Type B, in Cagliari
 12th Provisions Supply Company, in Cagliari
 12th Medical Company, in Cagliari
 C.M.S. Signal Company, in Cagliari -> 47th Signal Company
 Military Hospital Type B, in Cagliari

Southern Military Region - X C.M.T. 

 Regione Militare Meridionale - X C.M.T., in Naples (Regione Militare Meridionale (R.M.M.): Apulia, Basilicata, Calabria (minus Reggio Calabria province), Campania and Molise regions)
 new: R.M.M. Command Unit, in Naples
  48th Infantry Regiment "Ferrara" (CAR), in Bari -> disbanded
 Command and Services Company, in Bari -> disbanded
 I Battalion, in Bari ->  48th Infantry (Recruits Training) Battalion "Ferrara" (BAR) (assigned the flag of the 48th Infantry Regiment "Ferrara") --> 5th Army Corps
 II Battalion, in Campobasso -> disbanded
 III Battalion, in Potenza -> Detachment 244th Infantry (Recruits Training) Battalion "Cosenza" (BAR); in 1977 ->  91st Infantry (Recruits Training) Battalion "Lucania" (BAR) (assigned the flag of the 91st Infantry Regiment "Basilicata")
 IV Battalion, in Barletta -> Detachment 48th Infantry (Recruits Training) Battalion "Ferrara" (BAR); in 1977 ->  47th Infantry (Recruits Training) Battalion "Salento" (BAR) (assigned the flag of the 47th Infantry Regiment "Ferrara")
  9th Heavy Field Artillery Regiment, in Foggia -> disbanded
 Command and Services Battery, in Foggia -> disbanded
 I 155/23 Howitzers Group, in Foggia (M114 155mm towed howitzers) ->  9th Heavy Field Artillery Group "Foggia" (assigned the flag of the 9th Army Corps Artillery Regiment)
 II 155/23 Howitzers Group, in Barletta (M114 155mm towed howitzers) ->  2nd Heavy Field Artillery Group "Potenza" (assigned the flag of the 2nd Army Corps Artillery Regiment)
 III 155/23 Howitzers Group, in Persano (M114 155mm towed howitzers) ->  11th Heavy Field Artillery Group "Teramo" (assigned the flag of the 11th Army Corps Artillery Regiment)
 9th Artillery Specialists Battery, in Foggia -> disbanded
 I Armored Troops Recruits Training Battalion, in Avellino ->  231st Infantry (Recruits Training) Battalion "Avellino" (BAR) (assigned the flag of the 231st Infantry Regiment "Avellino") --> Motorized Brigade "Pinerolo"
 II Armored Troops Recruits Training Battalion, in Salerno ->  89th Infantry (Recruits Training) Battalion "Salerno" (BAR) (assigned the flag of the 89th Infantry Regiment "Salerno") --> Signal Specialists School
 Recruits Training Battalion "Sila", in Cosenza ->  244th Infantry (Recruits Training) Battalion "Cosenza" (BAR) (assigned the flag of the 244th Infantry Regiment "Cosenza")
 XLV Signal Battalion, in Naples ->  45th Signal Battalion "Vulture" (granted a new flag)
 10th Supply Unit, in Naples
 10th Mixed Transport Unit, in Naples -> 10th Mixed Maneuver Transport Unit
 9th Army Repairs Workshop Type B, in Bari
 10th Army Repairs Workshop Type A, in Naples
 10th Provisions Supply Company, in Naples
 10th Medical Company, in Bari
 Military Hospital Type A, in Bari
 Military Hospital Type A, in Caserta
 Military Hospital Type B, in Naples
 Military Hospital Type B, in Catanzaro

Infantry Brigade "Pinerolo" 
  Infantry Brigade "Pinerolo", in Bari ->  Motorized Brigade "Pinerolo"
  9th Infantry Regiment "Bari", in Bari -> disbanded
 Command and Services Company, in Bari -> Command and Signal Unit "Pinerolo"
 I Infantry Battalion, in Trani ->  9th Motorized Infantry Battalion "Bari" (assigned the flag of the 9th Infantry Regiment "Bari")
 II Infantry Battalion, in Santa Maria Capua Vetere -> disbanded
 III Infantry Battalion, in Bari -> disbanded
 IV Mechanized Battalion, in Avellino ->  13th Motorized Infantry Battalion "Valbella" (assigned the flag of the 13th Infantry Regiment "Pinerolo")
 Regimental Anti-tank Company, in Bari (anti-tank guided missiles and M47 tanks) -> Anti-tank Company "Pinerolo"
 LX Armored Battalion, in Altamura (M47 Patton tanks and M113 APCs) ->  60th Armored Battalion "M.O. Locatelli" (granted a new flag)
 Field Artillery Group "Pinerolo", in Bari (M14/61 105mm towed howitzers) ->  47th Field Artillery Group "Gargano" (assigned the flag of the 47th Artillery Regiment "Bari") -> M114 155mm towed howitzers
 Light Aviation Unit "Pinerolo", at Bari Airport (L-21B Super Cup) -> 20th Light Airplanes and Helicopters Squadrons Group "Andromeda" ʘ-> Pontecagnano Airport --> Southern Military Region
 Engineer Company "Pinerolo", in Trani
 Signal Company "Pinerolo", in Bari --> Command and Signal Unit "Pinerolo"
 Supply, Repairs, Recovery Unit "Pinerolo", in Bari ->  Logistic Battalion "Pinerolo" (granted a new flag)
 Transport Unit "Pinerolo", in Bari -> disbanded

Sicily Military Region - XI C.M.T. 

 Sicily Military Region - XI C.M.T., in Palermo (Regione Militare della Sicilia (R.M.SI.): Sicily region and the Calabria province of Reggio Calabria)
 new: R.M.SI. Command Unit, in Palermo
  46th Infantry Regiment "Reggio" (CAR), in Palermo -> disbanded
 Command and Services Company, in Palermo -> disbanded
 I Battalion, in Palermo ->  46th Infantry (Recruits Training) Battalion "Reggio" (BAR) (assigned the flag of the 46th Infantry Regiment "Reggio") --> Motorized Brigade "Aosta"
 II Battalion, in Palermo -> disbanded
 III Battalion, in Palermo -> disbanded
  60th Infantry Regiment "Calabria" (CAR), in Trapani -> disbanded
 Command and Services Company, in Trapani -> disbanded
 I Battalion, in Trapani ->  60th Infantry (Recruits Training) Battalion "Col di Lana" (BAR) (assigned the flag of the 60th Infantry Regiment "Calabria")
 II Battalion, in Trapani -> disbanded
 III Battalion, in Trapani -> disbanded
 6th Signal Company, in Palermo -> 4 November 1975: 46th Signal Company -> 1 May 1976:  46th Signal Battalion "Mongibello" (granted a new flag)
 11th Supply Unit, in Messina
 11th Mixed Transport Unit, in Palermo -> 11th Mixed Maneuver Transport Unit
 11th Army Repairs Workshop Type B, in Palermo
 11th Provisions Supply Company, in Palermo
 11th Medical Company, in Palermo
 Military Hospital Type B, in Palermo
 Military Hospital Type B, in Messina
 new: Garrison Detachment, on Pantelleria island

Infantry Brigade "Aosta" 
  Infantry Brigade "Aosta", in Messina ->  Motorized Brigade "Aosta"
  5th Infantry Regiment "Aosta", in Messina -> disbanded
 Command and Services Company, in Messina -> Command and Signal Unit "Aosta"
 I Infantry Battalion, in Messina ->  5th Motorized Infantry Battalion "Col della Beretta" (assigned the flag of the 5th Infantry Regiment "Aosta")
 II Infantry Battalion, in Catania ->  62nd Motorized Infantry Battalion "Sicilia" (assigned the flag of the 62nd Infantry Regiment "Sicilia")
 III Infantry Battalion, in Palermo ->  141st Motorized Infantry Battalion "Catanzaro" (assigned the flag of the 141st Infantry Regiment "Catanzaro")
 Regimental Anti-tank Company, in Messina (anti-tank guided missiles and M47 tanks) -> Anti-tank Company "Aosta"
 LXII Armored Battalion, in Catania (M47 Patton tanks and M113 APCs) ->  62nd Armored Battalion "M.O. Jero" (granted a new flag)
 Field Artillery Group "Aosta", in Messina (M14/61 105mm towed howitzers) ->  24th Field Artillery Group "Peloritani" (assigned the flag of the 24th Artillery Regiment "Piemonte") -> M114 155mm towed howitzers
 Light Aviation Unit "Aosta", at Fontanarossa Airport (L-21B Super Cup) -> 30th Light Airplanes and Helicopters Squadrons Group "Pegaso" --> Sicily Military Region
 Engineer Company "Aosta", in Syracuse
 Signal Company "Aosta", in Messina --> Command and Signal Unit "Aosta"
 Supply, Repairs, Recovery Unit "Aosta", in Messina ->  Logistic Battalion "Aosta" (granted a new flag)
 Transport Unit "Aosta", in Messina -> disbanded

Anti-aircraft Artillery Command 

In peacetime the Anti-aircraft Artillery Command was under administrative control of the Artillery Inspectorate in Rome, in wartime it would have come under operational control of NATO's Allied Land Forces Southern Europe Command in Verona.
  Anti-aircraft Artillery Command, in Padua
 new: Command Unit, in Padua
  4th Anti-aircraft Missile Artillery Regiment, in Mantua
 Command and Services Battery, in Mantua
 I Missile Group, in Ravenna (MIM-23 Hawk anti-aircraft missile systems)
 II Missile Group, in Mantua (MIM-23 Hawk anti-aircraft missile systems)
 24th Signal Company, in Mantua
  5th Anti-aircraft Missile Artillery Regiment, in Mestre
 Command and Services Battery, in Mestre
 I Missile Group, in San Donà di Piave (MIM-23 Hawk anti-aircraft missile systems)
 II Missile Group, in Rovigo (MIM-23 Hawk anti-aircraft missile systems)
 25th Signal Company, in Mestre
  17th Light Anti-aircraft Artillery Regiment, in Brescia ->  17th Light Anti-aircraft Artillery Group "Sforzesca" (assigned the flag of the 17th Artillery Regiment "Sforzesca") ʘ-> Villafranca
 Command and Services Battery, in Brescia -> Command Battery ʘ-> Villafranca
 I Light Anti-aircraft Artillery Group, at Villafranca Air Base (L/70 40mm anti-aircraft cannons) -> 1st Light Anti-aircraft Artillery Battery / 17th Light Anti-aircraft Artillery Group "Sforzesca"
 II Light Anti-aircraft Artillery Group, at Istrana Air Base (L/70 40mm anti-aircraft cannons) -> 3rd Light Anti-aircraft Artillery Battery / 17th Light Anti-aircraft Artillery Group "Sforzesca"
 IV Light Anti-aircraft Artillery Group, at Ghedi Air Base (L/70 40mm anti-aircraft cannons) -> 2nd Light Anti-aircraft Artillery Battery / 17th Light Anti-aircraft Artillery Group "Sforzesca"
  18th Light Anti-aircraft Artillery Regiment, in Rimini -> disbanded, flag and traditions transferred to the I Field Artillery Group of the 13th Field Artillery Regiment
 Command and Services Battery, in Rimini -> disbanded
 I Light Anti-aircraft Artillery Group, in Rimini (L/70 40mm anti-aircraft cannons) -> III Light Anti-aircraft Artillery Group --> 121st Light Anti-aircraft Artillery Regiment "
 II Light Anti-aircraft Artillery Group, in Ferrara (L/70 40mm anti-aircraft cannons) -> IV Light Anti-aircraft Artillery Group --> 121st Light Anti-aircraft Artillery Regiment
  121st Light Anti-aircraft Artillery Regiment, in Bologna
 Command and Services Battery, in Bologna
 I Light Anti-aircraft Artillery Group, in Bologna (L/70 40mm anti-aircraft cannons)
 II Light Anti-aircraft Artillery Group, in Reggio Emilia (L/70 40mm anti-aircraft cannons) ʘ-> Mestre on 10 March 1977
 new: 21st Light Anti-aircraft Artillery Group "Sparviero" (Reserve), in Villafranca (equipment of the disbanded groups of the 17th Light Anti-aircraft Artillery Regiment)
 new: 22nd Light Anti-aircraft Artillery Group "Alcione" (Reserve), in Bologna (equipment of the disbanded groups of the 17th Light Anti-aircraft Artillery Regiment)
 Anti-aircraft Missiles Supply and Repairs Unit, in Montichiari
 Anti-aircraft Artillery Materiel Supply and Repairs Unit, in Bologna

Sources 
L'Esercito Italiano verso il 2000, a 6-tome book published by the Ufficio Storico (History Office) of the Italian army's General Staff is the main source for this article. The book contains the official history of every Italian army unit that was granted a flag. The other main sources of this article are the presidential decrees from 12 November 1976, n. 846 and 14 March 1977, n. 173, with which the President of the Italian Republic awarded the units created in the 1975 reform their flags and names. The third main source is the Circolare SME n. 350/151 del 4.8.1975 with which the Army General Staff informed all units of the changes affecting them during the reform.

References 

Structure of contemporary armies
Italian Army (post-1946)